= Mecodema atuanui =

Scientific classification
- Kingdom: Animalia
- Phylum: Arthropoda
- Class: Insecta
- Order: Coleoptera
- Suborder: Adephaga
- Family: Carabidae
- Genus: Mecodema
- Species: M. atuanui

Binomial name
- Mecodema atuanui Seldon & Buckley 2019

Species of beetle

Mecodema atuanui was described from a single male specimen collected in pitfall traps on Mount Auckland (Atuanui), Kaipara Region. It is a medium-length ground beetle that is related to Mecodema spiniferum, the only large-lengthed ground beetle species found in the Waitākere Ranges, Auckland, rather than the more geographically close species (M. dunnorum) to the east in Puhoi.

== Diagnosis ==
Distinguished from other North Island Mecodema species by having:

1. a lobate labrum;
2. vertexal groove defined by punctures the entire length;
3. elytral intervals 3 and 5 significantly broadened than other intervals;
4. the distinctive narrow width of the apical portion of the penis lobe.

== Description ==
Length 24.9 mm, pronotal width 6.7 mm, elytral width 7.9 mm. Colour of entire body matte black, except coxae and legs dark reddish-brown.
