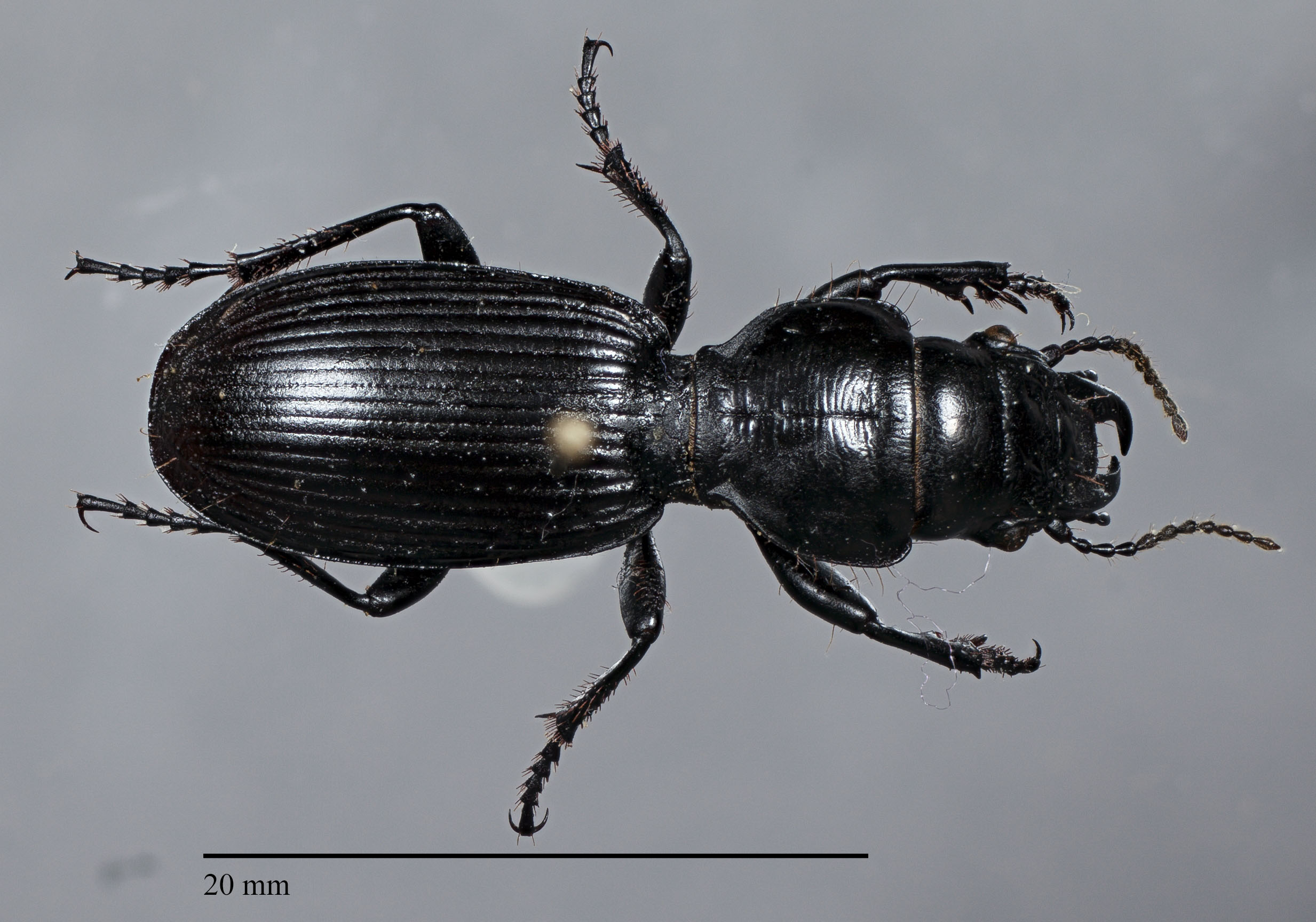
- Dorsal view of specimen

Scientific classification
- Kingdom: Animalia
- Phylum: Arthropoda
- Class: Insecta
- Order: Coleoptera
- Suborder: Adephaga
- Family: Carabidae
- Genus: Mecodema
- Species: M. jacinda

Binomial name
- Mecodema jacinda Seldon & Buckley, 2019

= Mecodema jacinda =

Species of beetle

Mecodema jacinda is a large-bodied ground beetle endemic to Maungatautari Sanctuary, Waikato, New Zealand. It is the largest species of Mecodema found on Maungatautari, which also has the medium-sized M. curvidens inhabiting the forest. It is named after former New Zealand Prime Minister Jacinda Ardern.

== Diagnosis ==
Differing from all other North Island Mecodema species by:

1. vertex smooth, vertexal groove defined by a few obsolescent punctures;
2. the pronotal carina broad the entire length with 8–12 setae each side;
3. interval 7 strongly convex in apical ⅓ (very distinctive);
4. the shape of the apical portion of the penis lobe.

== Description ==
Length 29–36 mm, pronotal width 7.9–10.2 mm, elytral width 9.1–11.6 mm. Colour of entire body matte to glossy black (especially pronotum).

== Natural history ==
Relatively common and can be found under logs and rocks in native forest.
