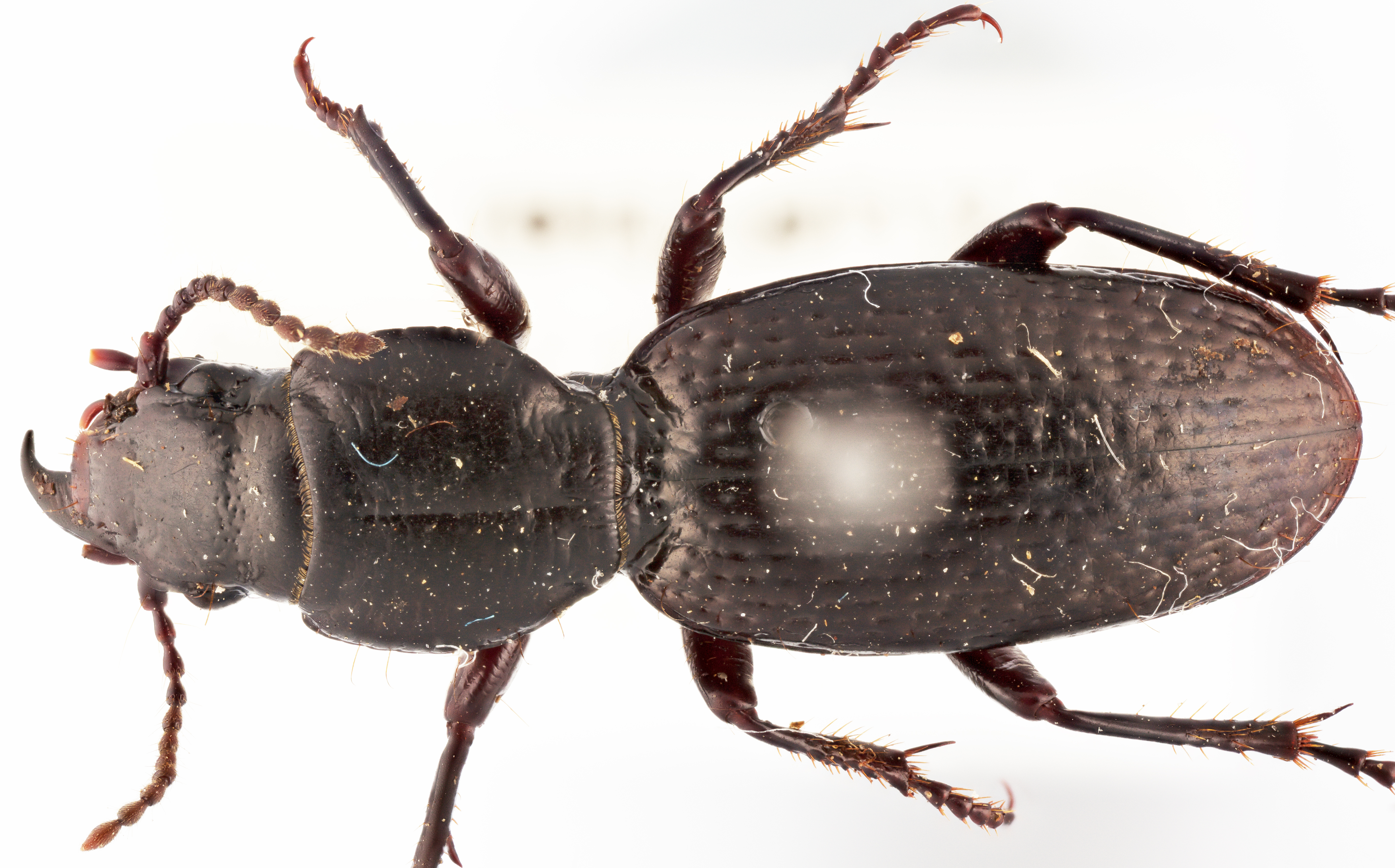
- Dorsal view of specimen

Scientific classification
- Kingdom: Animalia
- Phylum: Arthropoda
- Class: Insecta
- Order: Coleoptera
- Suborder: Adephaga
- Family: Carabidae
- Genus: Mecodema
- Species: M. longicolle

Binomial name
- Mecodema longicolle Broun, 1923

= Mecodema longicolle =

Species of beetle

Mecodema longicolle is an endemic New Zealand ground beetle, and one of the few Mecodema species found in both the North Island and South Island.

== Diagnosis ==
Distinguished from other North Island Mecodema species by having:

1. stipes with 3 basal setae seta;
2. prothoracic carina narrow the entire length, moderately crenulated with 7–9 setae each side;
3. distinctive shape of apical portion of the penis lobe.

== Description ==
Length 15.5–20 mm, pronotal width 3.9–5 mm, elytral width 4.7–6 mm. Colour of entire body dark reddish-brown to glossy black, coxae reddish-brown, legs black.

== Natural history ==
Mecodema longicolle is found in the North Island native forests from Taranaki to Hawke's Bay south to Wellington. It shares this range with another similar sized species, M. florae, but they are often separated by altitude.
