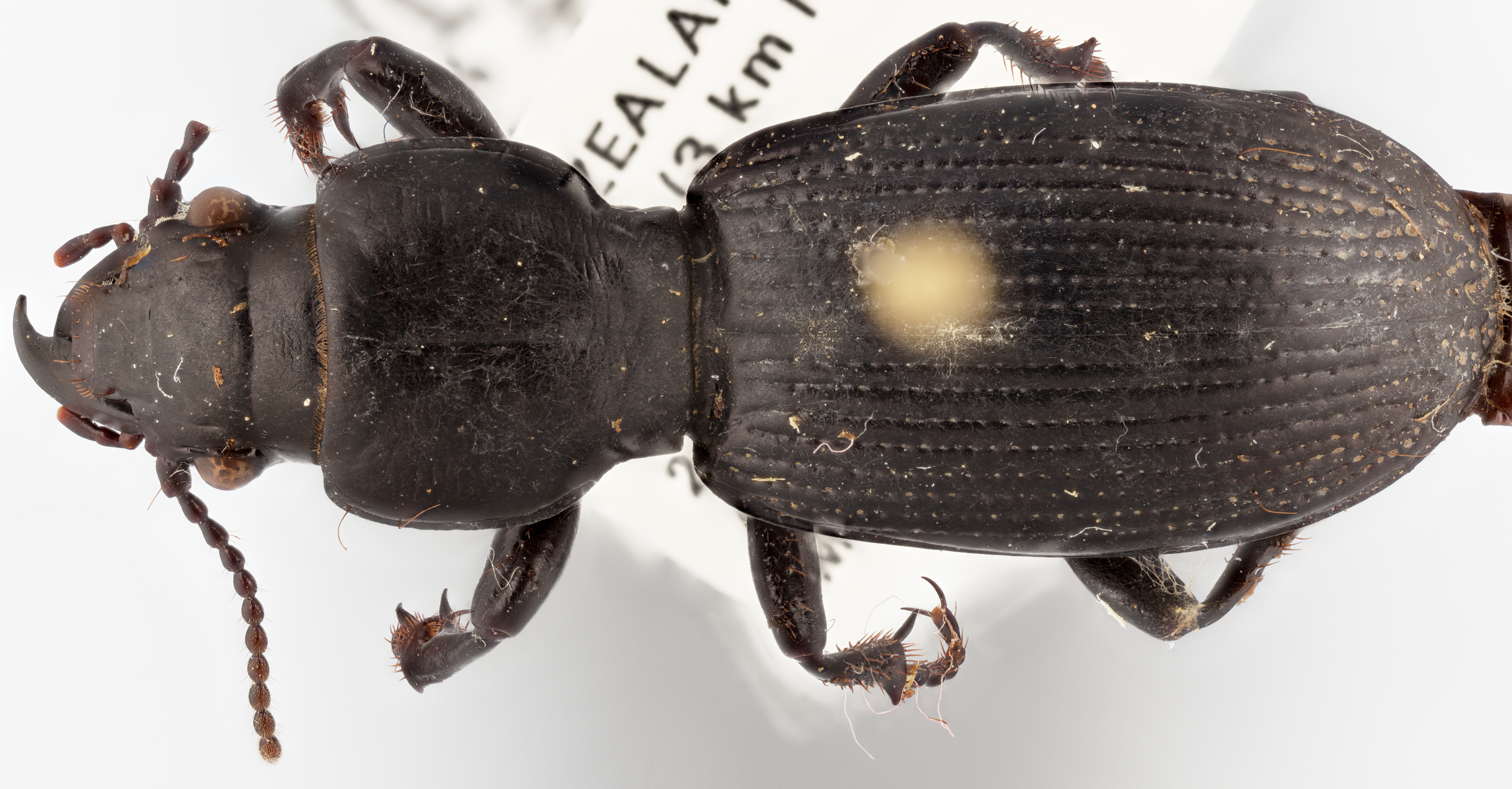

Conservation status
- Nationally Endangered (NZ TCS)

Scientific classification
- Kingdom: Animalia
- Phylum: Arthropoda
- Class: Insecta
- Order: Coleoptera
- Suborder: Adephaga
- Family: Carabidae
- Genus: Mecodema
- Species: M. atrox

Binomial name
- Mecodema atrox Britton 1949

= Mecodema atrox =

Species of beetle

Mecodema atrox is a medium-sized (17–24 mm length, 6–8 mm width) ground beetle species that is closely related to Mecodema curvidens (a very widespread species throughout the Bay of Plenty and Central Plateau). Mecodema atrox is relatively rare in comparison due to its preferred habitat, the coastal broadleaf forests of the Coromandel Peninsula, a forest type that is in decline. The body of Mecodema atrox is black and the legs are dark reddish-brown. They can be distinguished from other Mecodema species by a number of characters, including the pattern of asetose punctures along the elytral striae.

This species is part of the curvidens group that has a geographical distribution from Northland (including the Three Kings Island) to Banks Peninsula, South Island. Species of the curvidens group predominantly follow an eastern distribution including species on the offshore islands (e.g., Poor Knights Island, Hauturu (Little Barrier Island) and Aotea (Great Barrier Island). There are no species from this group found in the Auckland entomological region, but they are found in the Coromandel Peninsula.

== Description ==
See Seldon & Buckley 2019.

== Natural history ==
Nothing is known of the larvae and little is known of the adults, but M. atrox is a coastal forest-dweller that feeds on a range of ground invertebrates. It is flightless with low dispersal capabilities, however it is a species within a ground beetle genus that has dispersed across New Zealand and many offshore islands.

== Conservation status ==
Under the New Zealand Threat Classification System, this species is listed as "Nationally Endangered" with the qualifiers of "Data Poor" and "Biologically Sparse".
