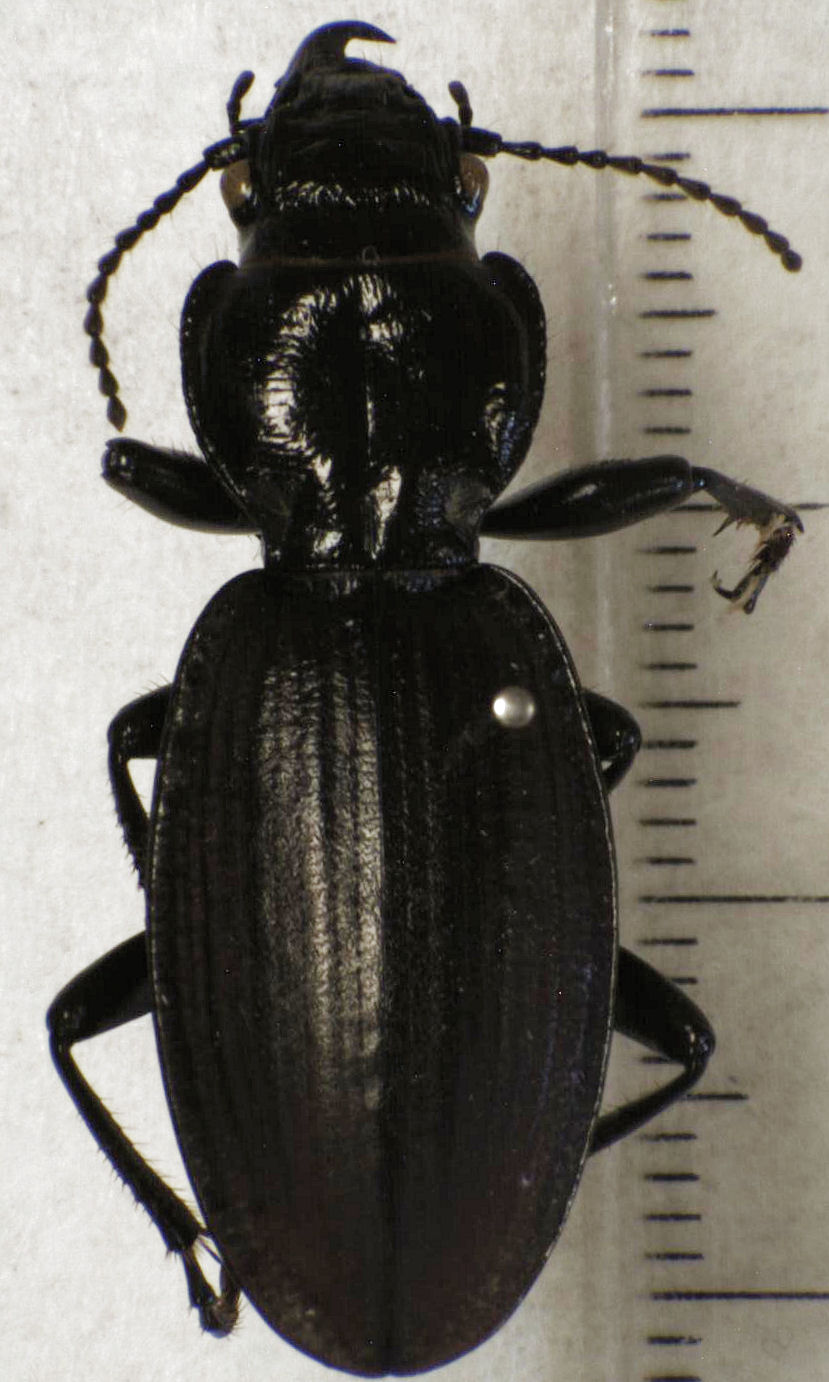

Conservation status
- Not Threatened (NZ TCS)

Scientific classification
- Kingdom: Animalia
- Phylum: Arthropoda
- Clade: Pancrustacea
- Class: Insecta
- Order: Coleoptera
- Suborder: Adephaga
- Family: Carabidae
- Genus: Mecodema
- Species: M. allani

Binomial name
- Mecodema allani Fairburn, 1945

= Mecodema allani =

Species of beetle

Mecodema allani is a ground beetle of the family Carabidae, endemic to the South Island, New Zealand. It is one of two species within the laterale group, which are large-bodied species with a distinctively broad lateral carina along the elytra that is reflexed (curved upward). Under the New Zealand Threat Classification System, this species is listed as "Not Threatened".
