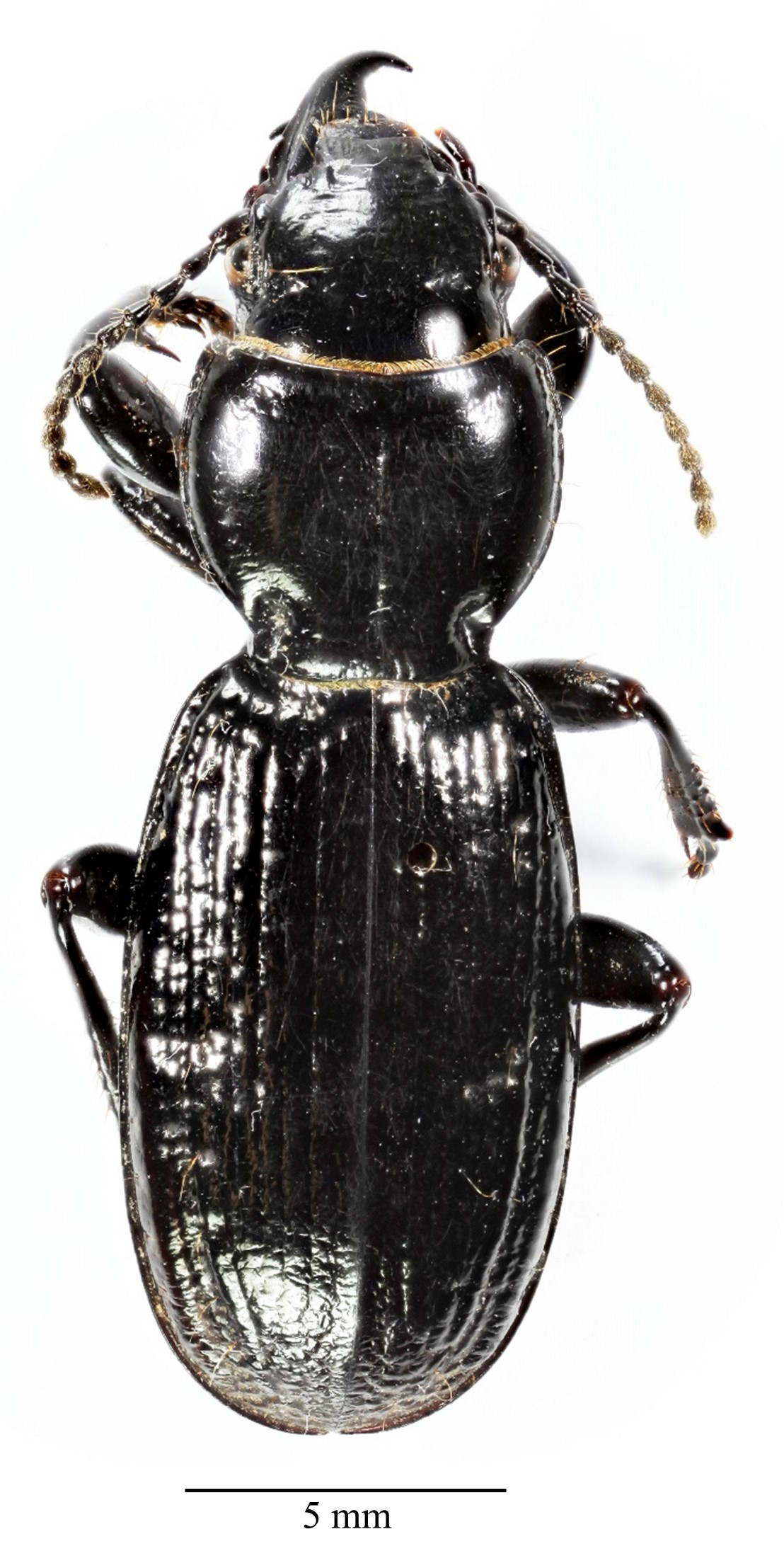

Scientific classification
- Kingdom: Animalia
- Phylum: Arthropoda
- Class: Insecta
- Order: Coleoptera
- Suborder: Adephaga
- Family: Carabidae
- Genus: Mecodema
- Species: M. haakuturi

Binomial name
- Mecodema haakuturi Seldon & Pou, 2024

= Mecodema haakuturi =

Species of beetle

Mecodema haakuturi is a species of ground beetle, restricted to the escarpment of the northeastern arm of the Parataiko Range, western Northland Region, New Zealand. This species is within the curvidens species group, which includes these other species: M. kokoromatua, M. manaia, M. parataiko, M. tenaki, etc.

Diagnosis.

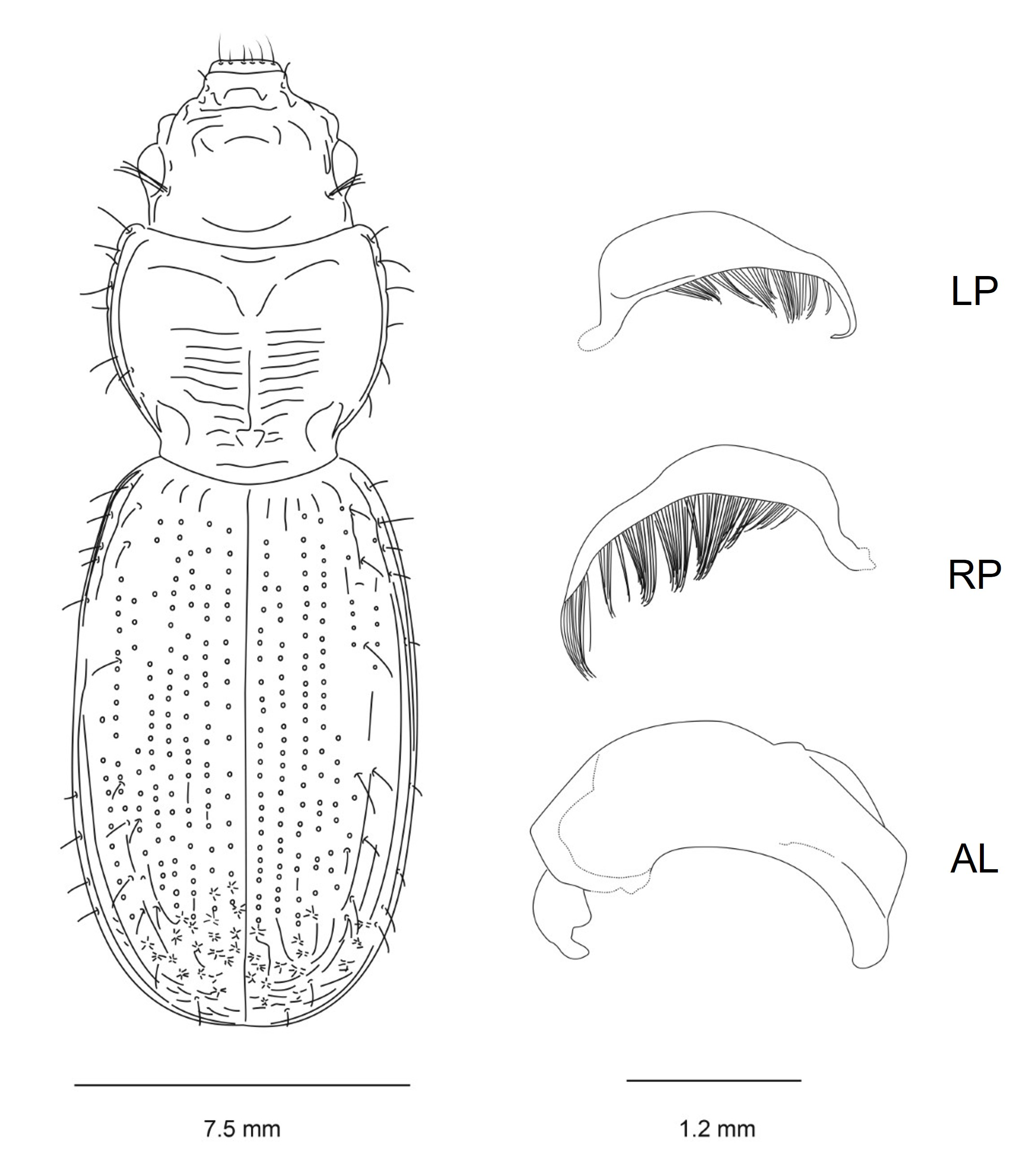
Habitus drawing, dorsal view, with male aedeagus structures: RL = right paramere, LP = left paramere and AL = adeagal lobe.

Distinguishable from other North Island Mecodema species by having: (1) the vertexal groove absent, except a few wrinkles sparsely distributed laterally; (2) asetose punctures of elytral striae stellate (star-shaped) in the apical third (Fig. 3, Seldon & Pou 2024); and (3) regarding the apical shape of the aedeagal lobe, the form of the left paramere is distinctive with long setae extending along 4/5 of the ventral edge (Fig. 2, LP, AL, Seldon & Pou 2024).
