= Mecodema parataiko =

Scientific classification
- Kingdom: Animalia
- Phylum: Arthropoda
- Class: Insecta
- Order: Coleoptera
- Suborder: Adephaga
- Family: Carabidae
- Genus: Mecodema
- Species: M. parataiko

Binomial name
- Mecodema parataiko Seldon & Leschen, 2011

Species of beetle

Mecodema parataiko is a species of beetle, the most widespread of the Northland species, being found in forests from Whangārei north to Herekino.
