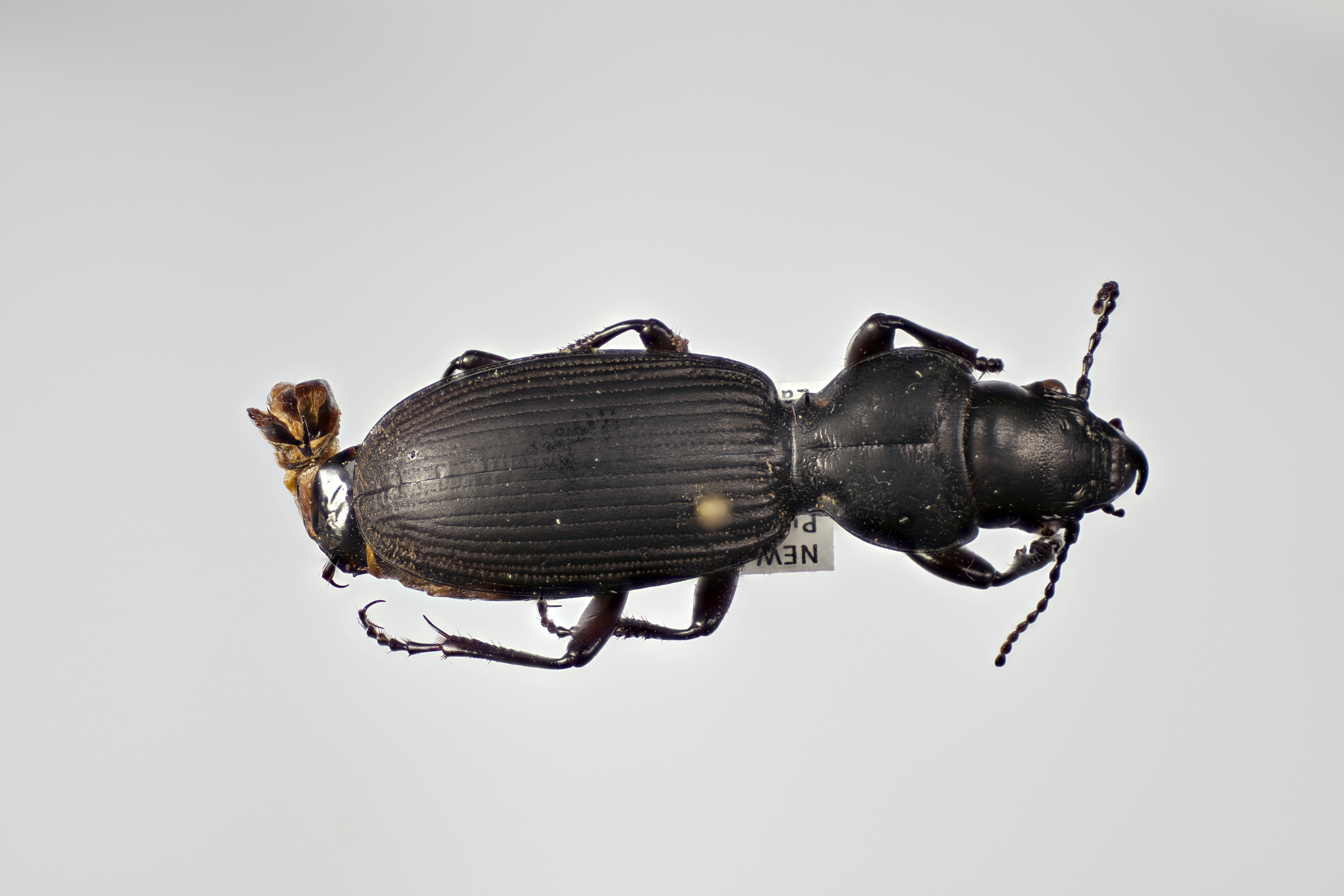
- Mecodema validum Pureora dorsal

Scientific classification
- Kingdom: Animalia
- Phylum: Arthropoda
- Class: Insecta
- Order: Coleoptera
- Suborder: Adephaga
- Family: Carabidae
- Genus: Mecodema
- Species: M. validum

Binomial name
- Mecodema validum Broun, 1923

= Mecodema validum =

Species of beetle

Mecodema validum is a large-bodied ground beetle endemic to New Zealand. It is geographically widespread, ranging from Mt. Te Aroha in the north to the Ruahine Ranges in the south, with Ohakune as its type locality. This species belongs to the spiniferum group, and there is some variability in external morphological characteristics across its distribution. However, the structure of the male genitalia remains constant, with only slight variation observed in the easternmost population in northern Hawke's Bay.
