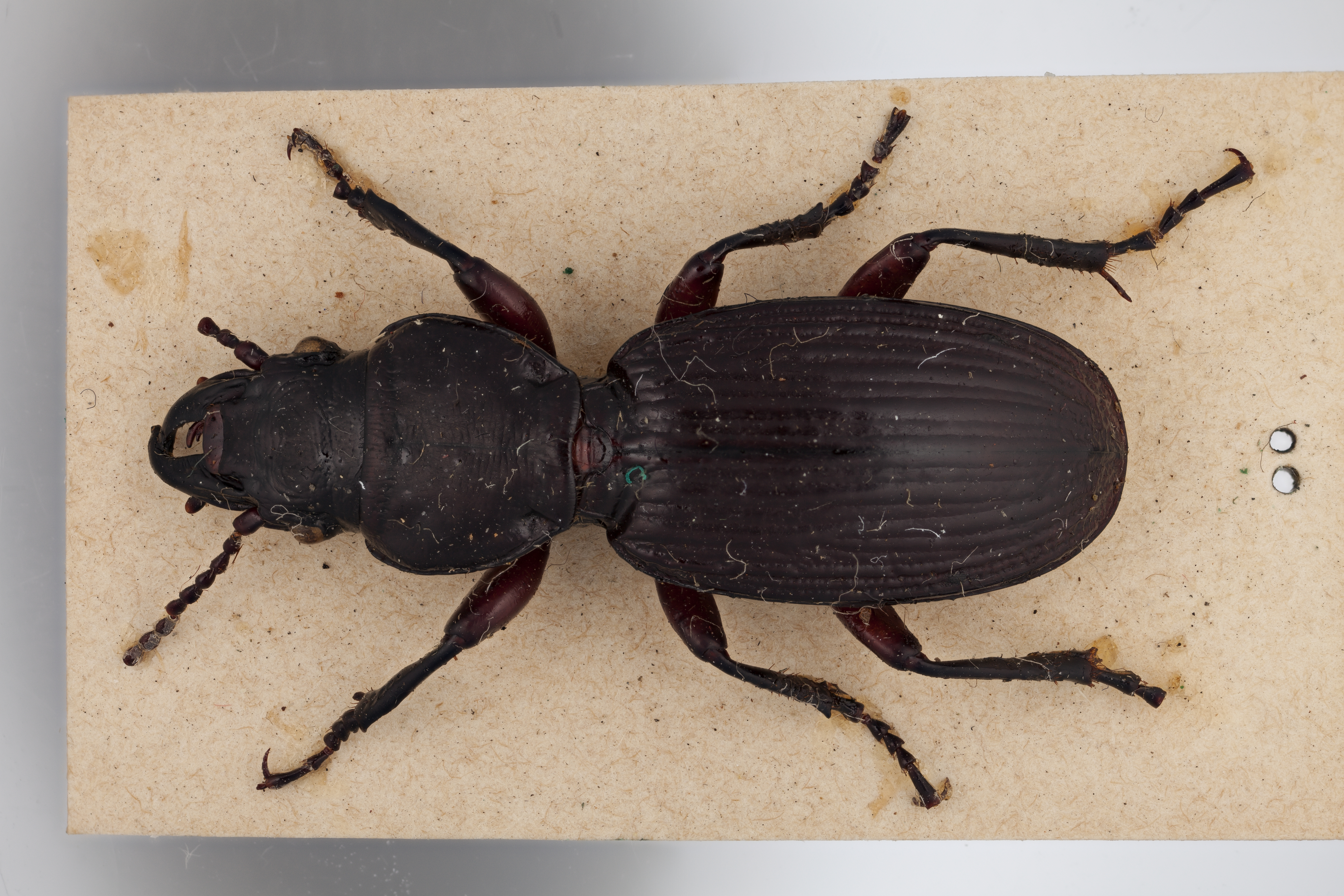
- M. quoinense holotype

Conservation status
- Nationally Critical (NZ TCS)

Scientific classification
- Kingdom: Animalia
- Phylum: Arthropoda
- Class: Insecta
- Order: Coleoptera
- Suborder: Adephaga
- Family: Carabidae
- Genus: Mecodema
- Species: M. quoinense

Binomial name
- Mecodema quoinense Broun, 1915

= Mecodema quoinense =

Species of beetle

Mecodema quoinense is a large-bodied ground beetle of the genus Mecodema, an endemic New Zealand carabid, which is found in the Tararua Ranges, North Island above about 1000 m. It is named after the type locality Mount Quoin, but specimens have been found on Mount Holdsworth. This species can be distinguished from other Mecodema species by the very distinctive shape of the male genitalia, but it can be differentiated from the other more common Tararua Ranges species, M. simplex, by the narrower/square-shaped pronotum, and the smooth (not crenulated) carina of the pronotum. Under the New Zealand Threat Classification System, this species is listed as "Nationally Critical" with the qualifiers of "One Location" and "Sparse".
