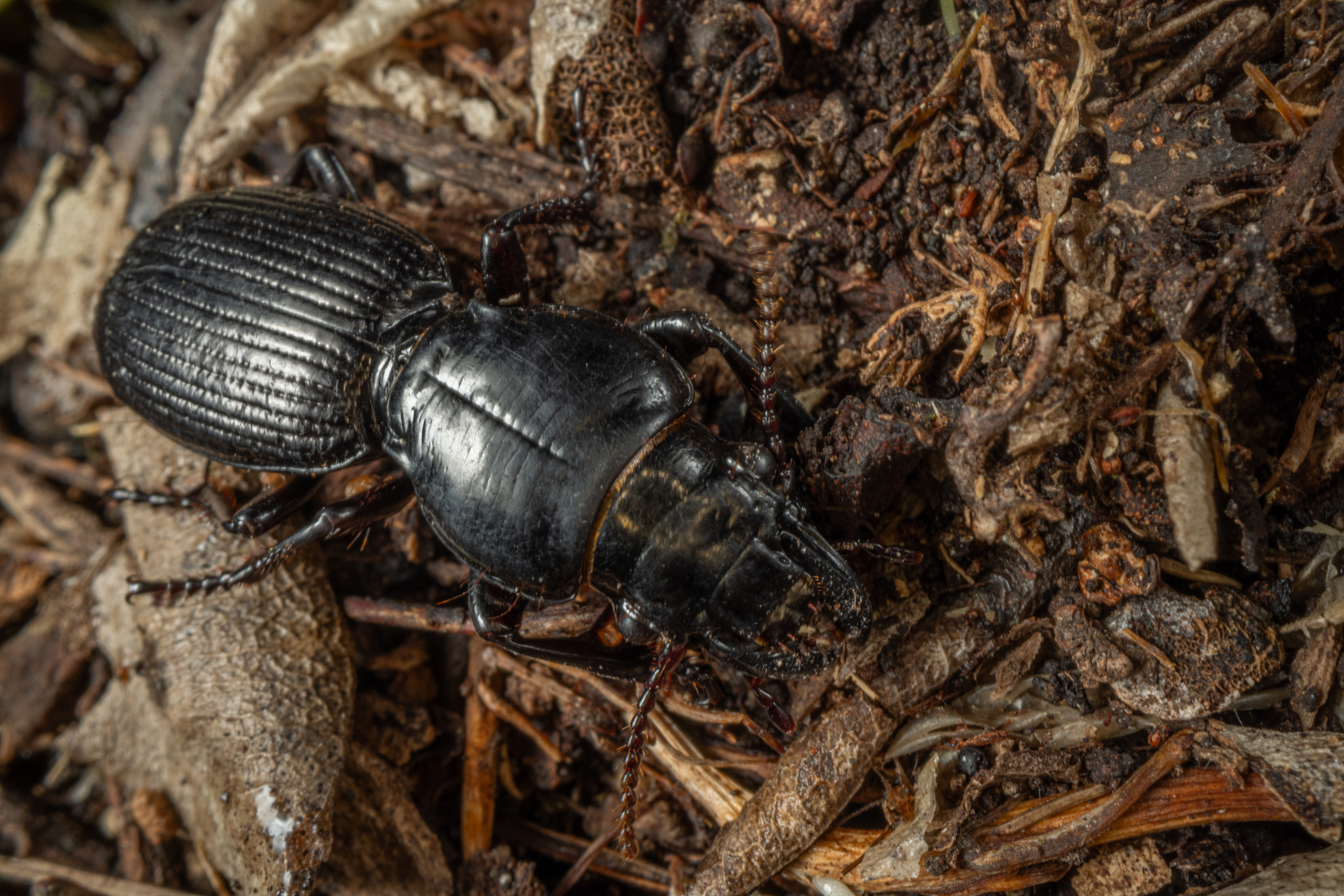

Conservation status
- Naturally Uncommon (NZ TCS)

Scientific classification
- Kingdom: Animalia
- Phylum: Arthropoda
- Class: Insecta
- Order: Coleoptera
- Suborder: Adephaga
- Family: Carabidae
- Genus: Mecodema
- Species: M. ponaiti

Binomial name
- Mecodema ponaiti Seldon & Leschen, 2011

= Mecodema ponaiti =

Species of beetle

Mecodema ponaiti is a species of ground beetle endemic to the Poor Knights Islands, Northland, New Zealand.Under the New Zealand Threat Classification System, this species is listed as "Naturally Uncommon" with the qualifiers of "Island Endemic" and "One Location".
