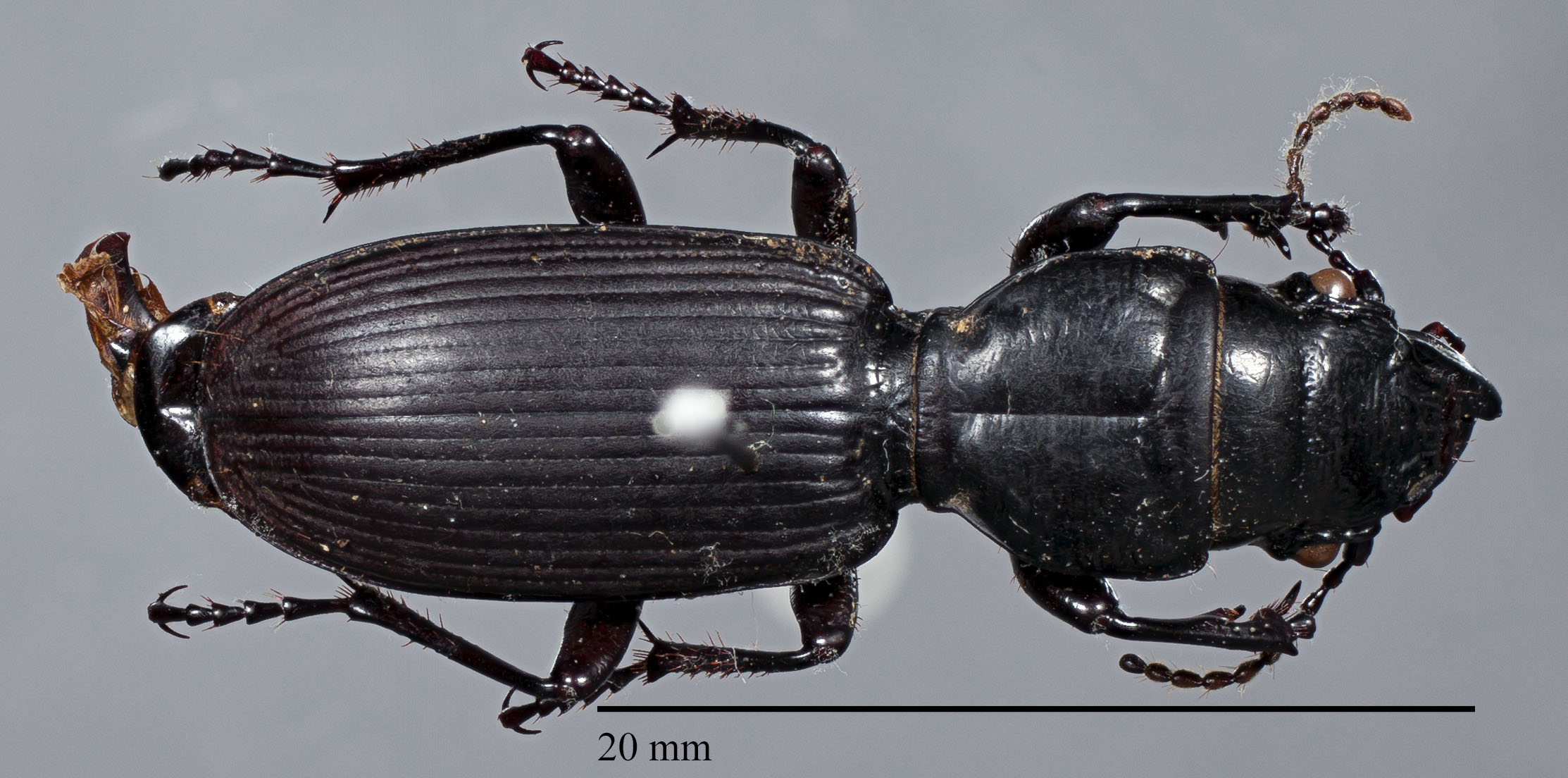

Scientific classification
- Kingdom: Animalia
- Phylum: Arthropoda
- Class: Insecta
- Order: Coleoptera
- Suborder: Adephaga
- Family: Carabidae
- Genus: Mecodema
- Species: M. argentum

Binomial name
- Mecodema argentum Seldon & Buckley, 2019

= Mecodema argentum =

Species of beetle

Mecodema argentum is a large-bodied (29–32 mm length, 8.5–10 mm width) ground beetle found in the northern region of the Coromandel Range, New Zealand and relatively abundant in the hills above Coromandel town. Mecodema argentum is more closely related to Mecodema species found in Northland, than other species found in the Coromandel Ranges. The entire body is black, but the legs and coxae may be reddish brown, plus M. argentum can be distinguished from other North Island Mecodema by the form of the apical portion of the penis lobe.
