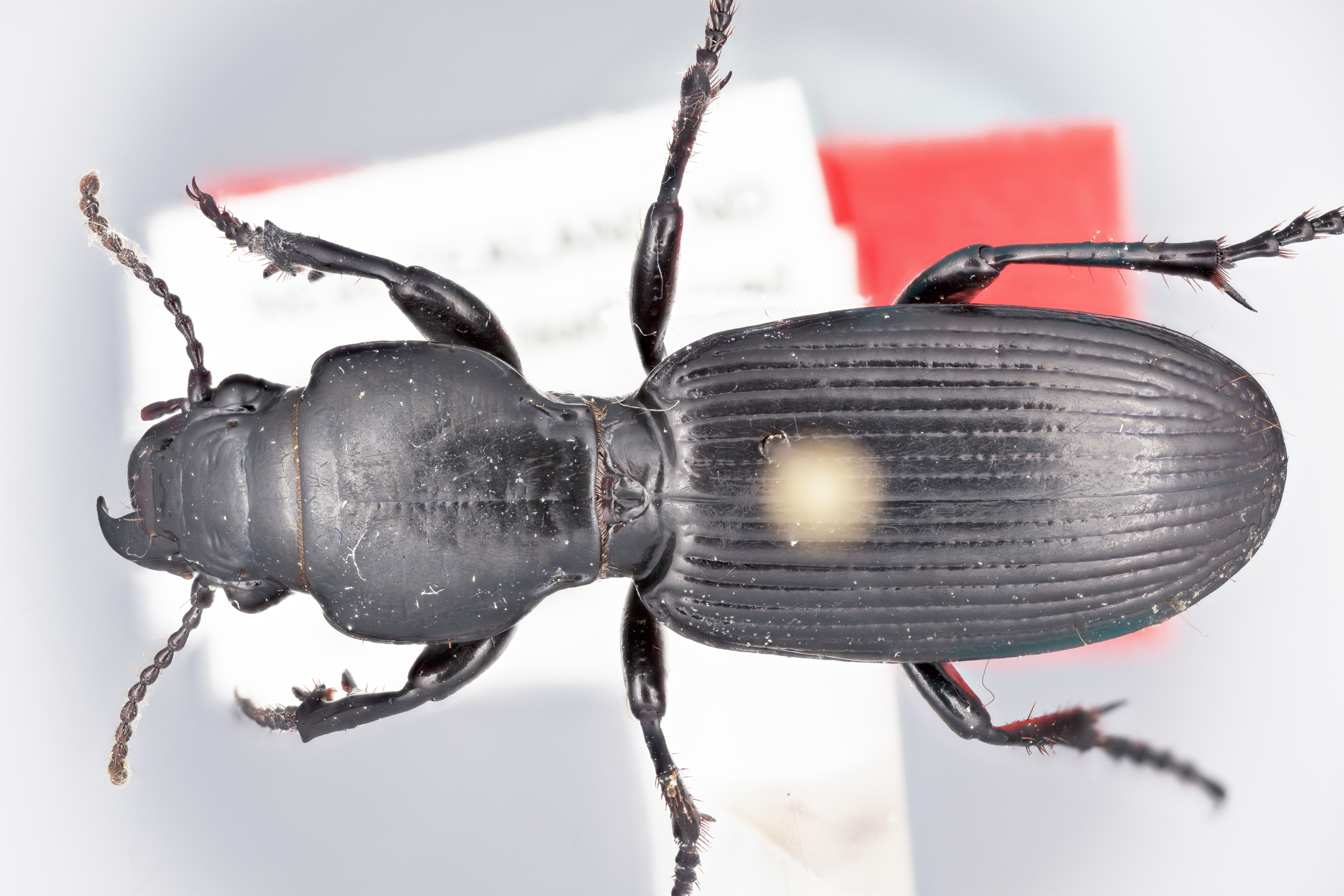
- Mecodema kokoromatua (curvidens group)

Scientific classification
- Kingdom: Animalia
- Phylum: Arthropoda
- Class: Insecta
- Order: Coleoptera
- Suborder: Adephaga
- Family: Carabidae
- Genus: Mecodema
- Species: M. kokoromatua

Binomial name
- Mecodema kokoromatua Seldon, Leschen & Liebherr, 2012

= Mecodema kokoromatua =

Species of beetle

Mecodema kokoromatua is a medium-bodied ground beetle endemic to Northland, New Zealand. Its range is restricted to coastal forest behind the sand dunes and below the southern areas of the Ahipara Escarpment, Herekino, Northland, New Zealand. This species is within the curvidens species group and is related to the geographically widespread M. parataiko.

== Diagnosis ==
Differs from other North Island Mecodema species due to having:

1. less than or equal to six setae along the pronotal carina (curvidens species group);
2. mesocoxa and metacoxa with setose punctures absent;
3. the shape of the left paramere basal lobe is a small and very narrowly rectangular with a short slope to arm, terminal lobe with tuft of medium length setae.

== Description ==
Length 22–25 mm, pronotal width 4–4.5 mm, elytral width 5–5.5 mm. Colour of entire body matte to glossy black, coxae may be dark reddish-brown.

== Natural history ==
Restricted to sandy soils of the Pleistocene dune systems with coastal broadleaf forest of southwestern Ahipara District, Northland.
