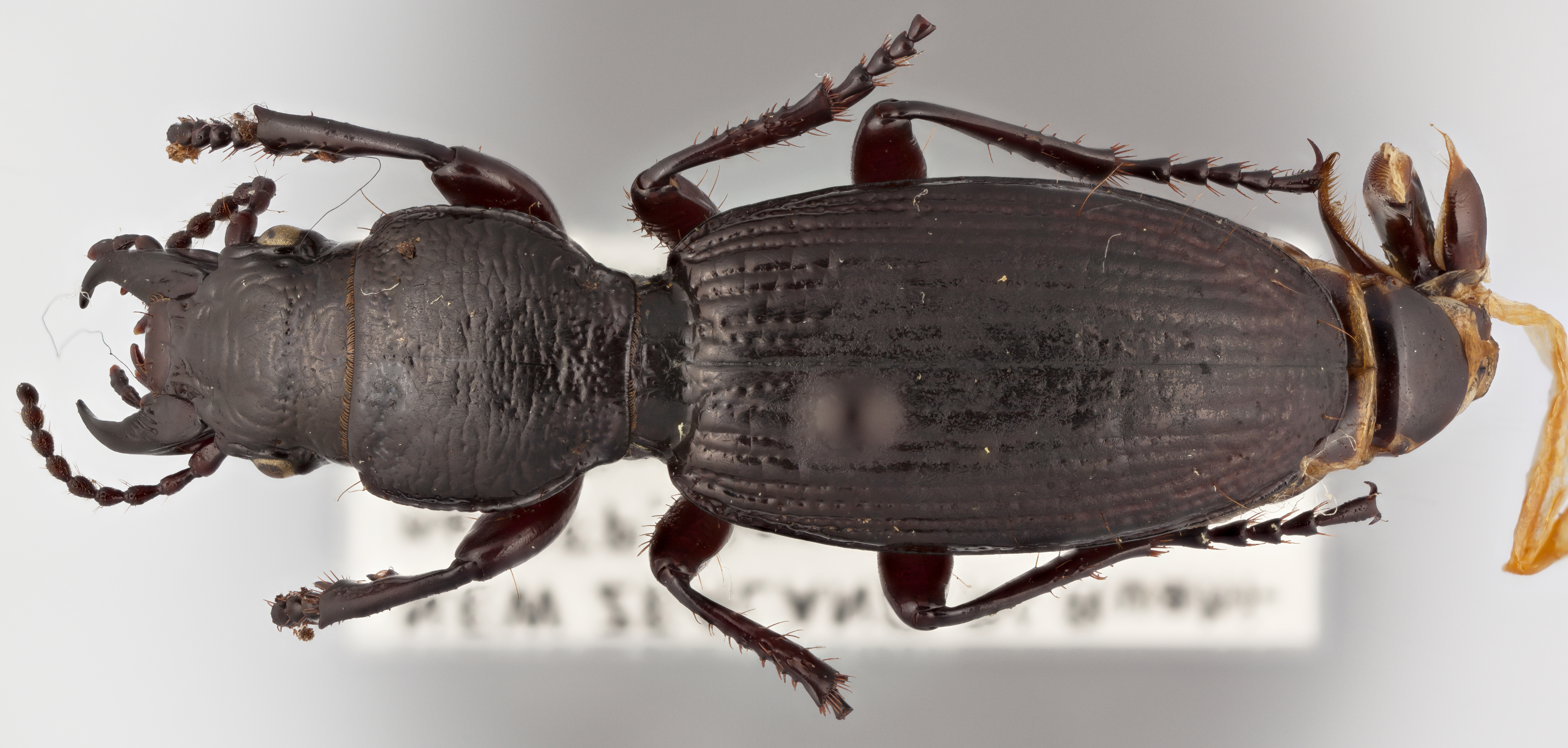

Conservation status
- Not Threatened (NZ TCS)

Scientific classification
- Kingdom: Animalia
- Phylum: Arthropoda
- Class: Insecta
- Order: Coleoptera
- Suborder: Adephaga
- Family: Carabidae
- Genus: Mecodema
- Species: M. dux

Binomial name
- Mecodema dux Britton, 1949

= Mecodema dux =

Species of beetle

Mecodema dux is a medium-bodied New Zealand endemic ground beetle that is found in the Ruahine Ranges, Taupo, Rangitikei and southwestern Hawke's Bay entomological regions.

== Diagnosis ==
Distinguished from other North Island Mecodema species by:

1. the overall pronotal shape being ovate;
2. numerous punctures between pronotal foveae;
3. elytral striae 1–4 with obsolescent punctures, striae 5–8 with punctures more impressed;
4. the distinctive shape of the apical portion of the penis lobe.

== Description ==
Length 19–24 mm, pronotal width 5–6 mm, elytral width 6–7.1 mm. Colour of entire body dark reddish-brown to matte black, coxae and legs reddish-brown.

== Natural history ==
A flightless and nocturnal predator of a variety of invertebrates on the forest floor.

Further research is required.

== Conservation status ==
Under the New Zealand Threat Classification System, this species is listed as "Not Threatened".
