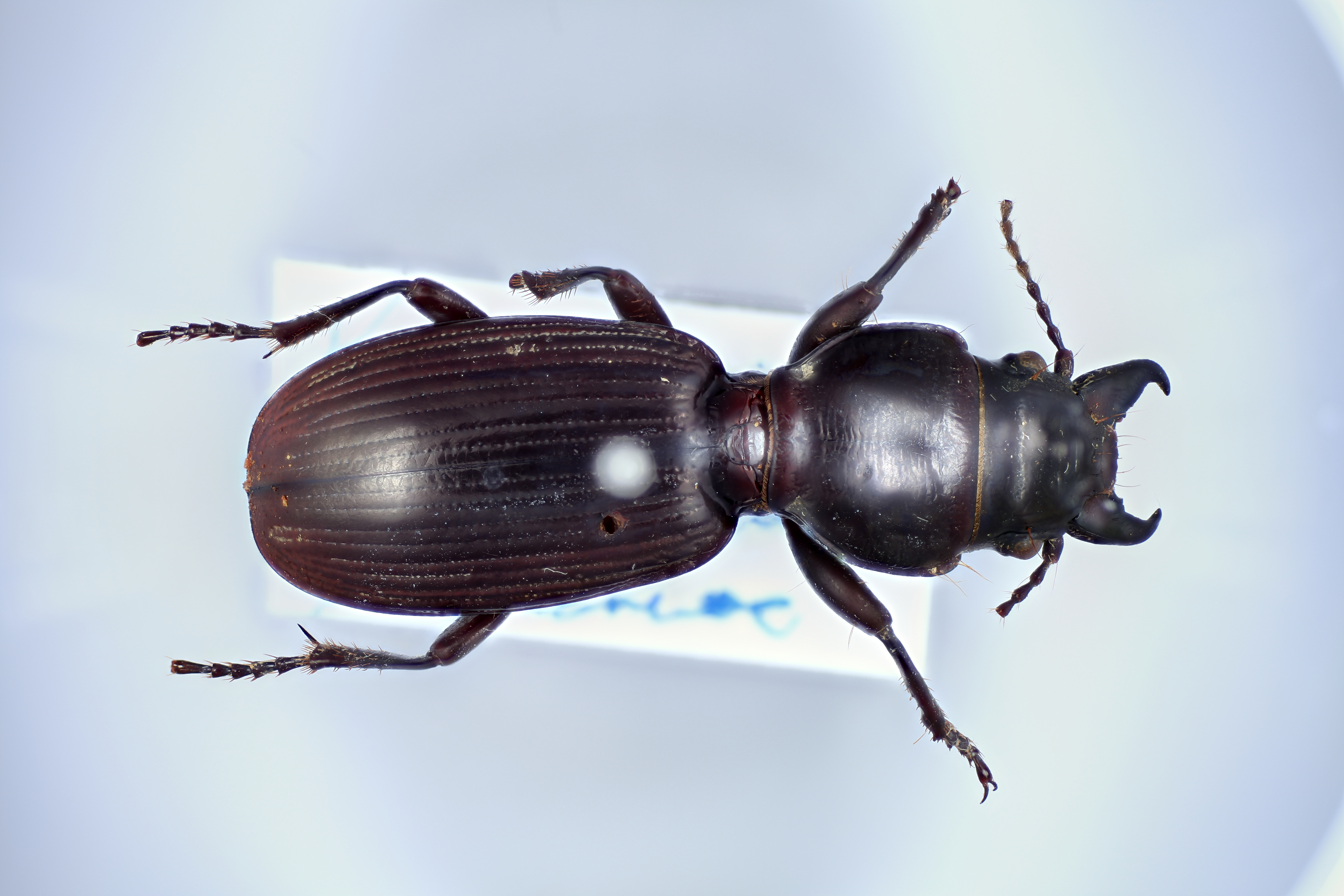

Scientific classification
- Kingdom: Animalia
- Phylum: Arthropoda
- Class: Insecta
- Order: Coleoptera
- Suborder: Adephaga
- Family: Carabidae
- Genus: Mecodema
- Species: M. kipjac

Binomial name
- Mecodema kipjac Seldon & Buckley, 2019

= Mecodema kipjac =

Species of beetle

Mecodema kipjac is a large-bodied ground beetle species found near Kirikopuni in Northland, New Zealand.

== Diagnosis ==
Distinguished from other Mecodema species in the North Island by:

1. the small foveae situated directly behind the eye;
2. anterad pronotal foveae on the disc a distinctive shallow depression with scattered pits and short wrinkles mesad foveae;
3. distinct shape of the apical portion of the penis lobe.

== Description ==
Length 33.1 mm, pronotal width 9.4 mm, elytral width 10.8 mm. Colour of entire body dark reddish-brown, head matte black.
