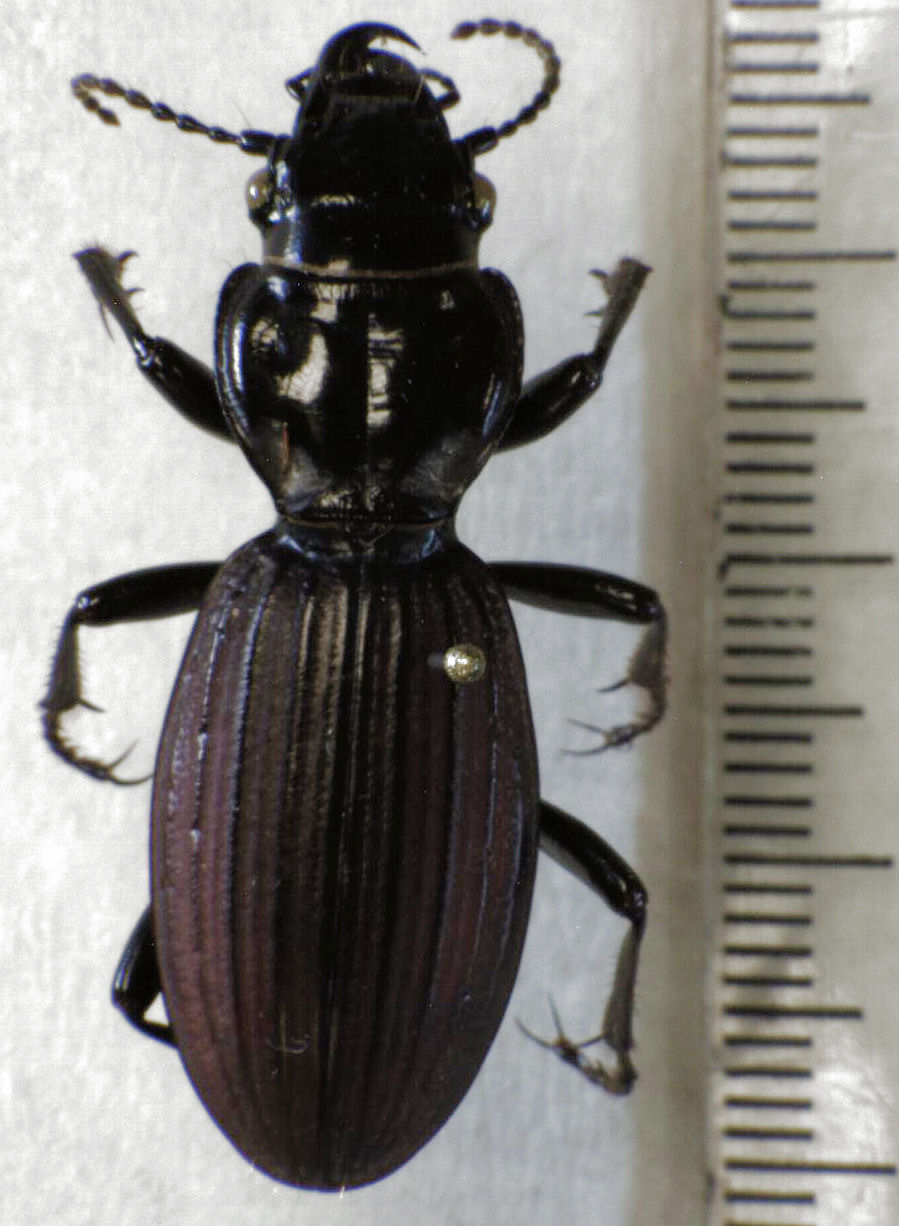

Scientific classification
- Kingdom: Animalia
- Phylum: Arthropoda
- Clade: Pancrustacea
- Class: Insecta
- Order: Coleoptera
- Suborder: Adephaga
- Family: Carabidae
- Genus: Mecodema
- Species: M. puiakium

Binomial name
- Mecodema puiakium Johns & Ewers, 2007

= Mecodema puiakium =

Species of beetle

Mecodema puiakium is a ground beetle of the family Carabidae, endemic to New Zealand.
