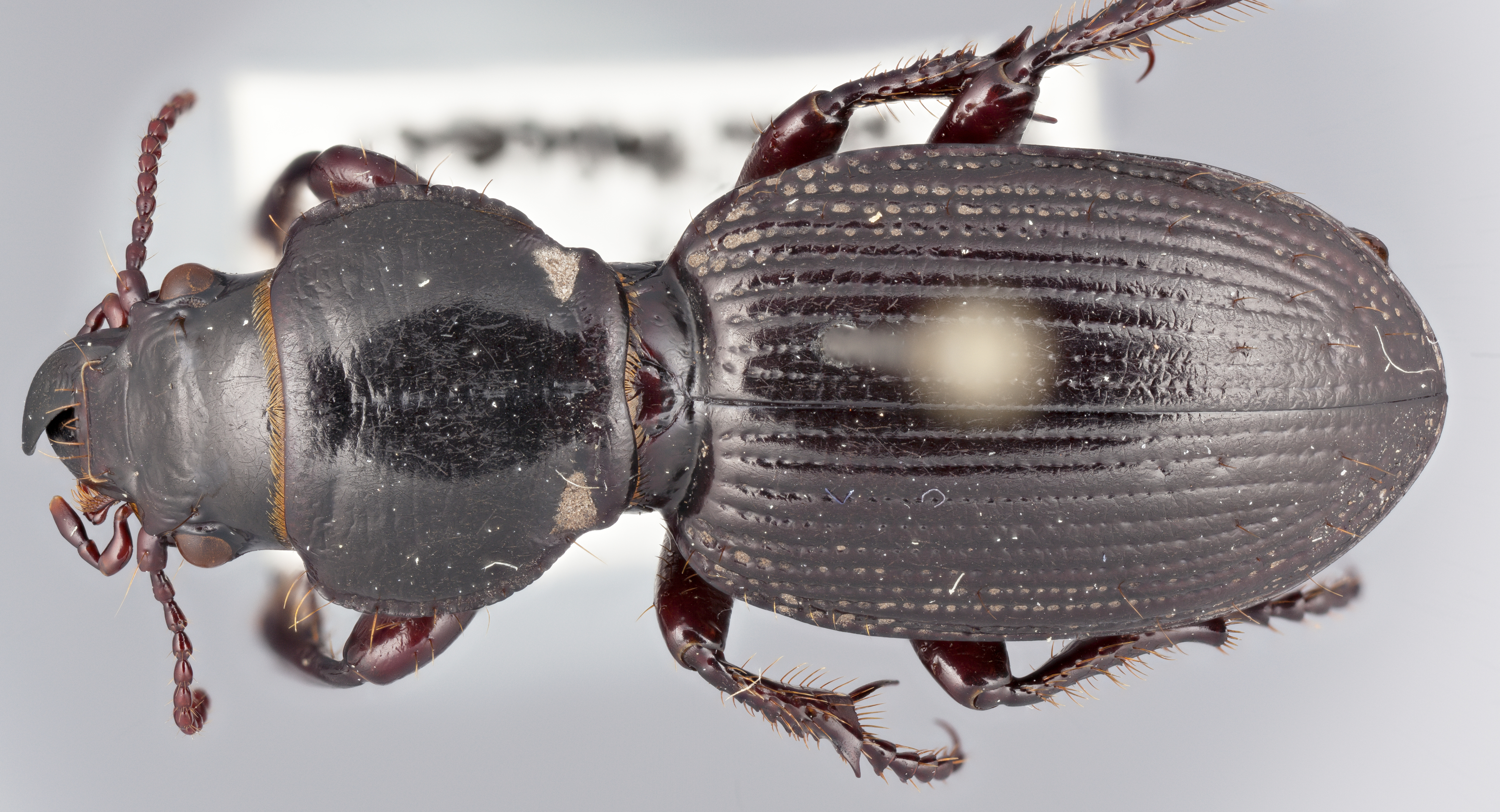
- Dorsal view of specimen

Scientific classification
- Kingdom: Animalia
- Phylum: Arthropoda
- Class: Insecta
- Order: Coleoptera
- Suborder: Adephaga
- Family: Carabidae
- Genus: Mecodema
- Species: M. moniliferum

Binomial name
- Mecodema moniliferum (Bates, 1867)

= Mecodema moniliferum =

Species of beetle

Mecodema moniliferum is a medium-sized ground beetle endemic to the South island, New Zealand. This species is part of the monophyletic curvidens group and is found on the braided-river systems of the South Island.

== Diagnosis ==
Distinguished from other Mecodema species by having:

1. ventrites 4–5 bearing numerous setose punctures;
2. elytral striae defined anteriorly and laterally by large, irregularly spaced asetose punctures;
3. shape of basal lobe and setal distribution along ventral edge of left paramere.

== Description ==
Length 14.6–19.5 mm, pronotal width 4.2–6.2 mm, elytral width 5.1–7.1 mm. Colour of entire body matte reddish-brown to matte black.

== Natural history ==
One of the three Mecodema species that is adapted to inhabiting the braided-river systems of Canterbury and Otago, South Island.
