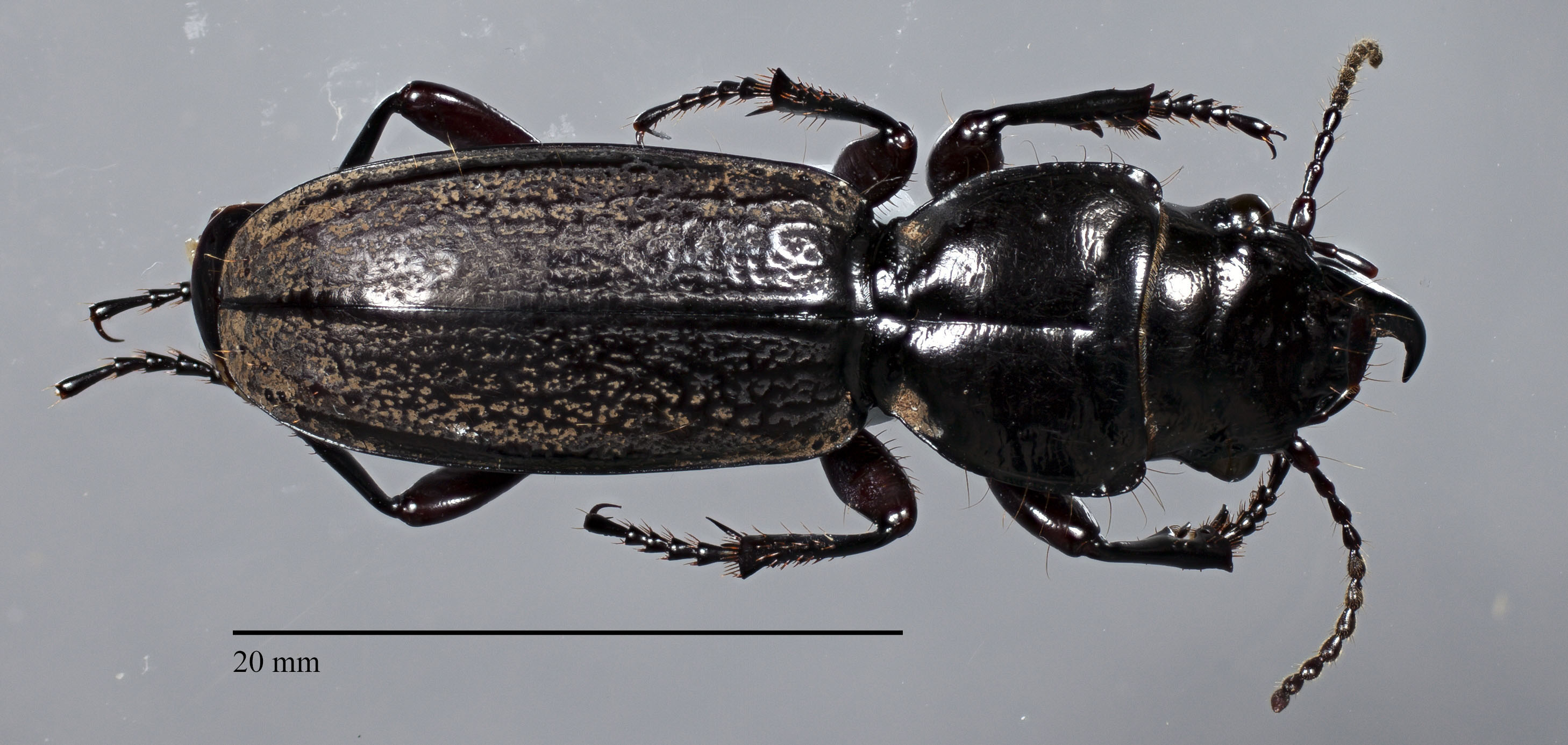
- The only known specimen of M.chaiup, found in 2008.

Scientific classification
- Kingdom: Animalia
- Phylum: Arthropoda
- Class: Insecta
- Order: Coleoptera
- Suborder: Adephaga
- Family: Carabidae
- Genus: Mecodema
- Species: M. chaiup

Binomial name
- Mecodema chaiup Seldon, 2015

= Mecodema chaiup =

Species of beetle

Mecodema chaiup is a large-bodied ground beetle species found in Mohi Bush Scenic Reserve, Hawke's Bay, New Zealand. A single specimen was found beneath a large log in 2008 by D.S. Seldon and C.P. Martin (who it is named after). Since then a number of intensive pitfall trap surveys of Mohi Bush have failed to collect further specimens.

== Diagnosis ==
Mecodema chaiup is distinguished from other North Island Mecodema by:

1. Narrow elytra (narrower than the pronotum at the widest point)
2. Distinct asetose punctures in a confused pattern that are irregular in size and shape

== Description ==
Length 31 mm, pronotal width 8.5 mm, elytral width 6.5 mm. Colour of entire body matte black, except for the femur and tibiae which are dark reddish-brown.

== Natural history ==
Flightless and presumably a nocturnal predator of a range of ground invertebrates (e.g., spiders, carabids, worms), as are the other members of the genus.
