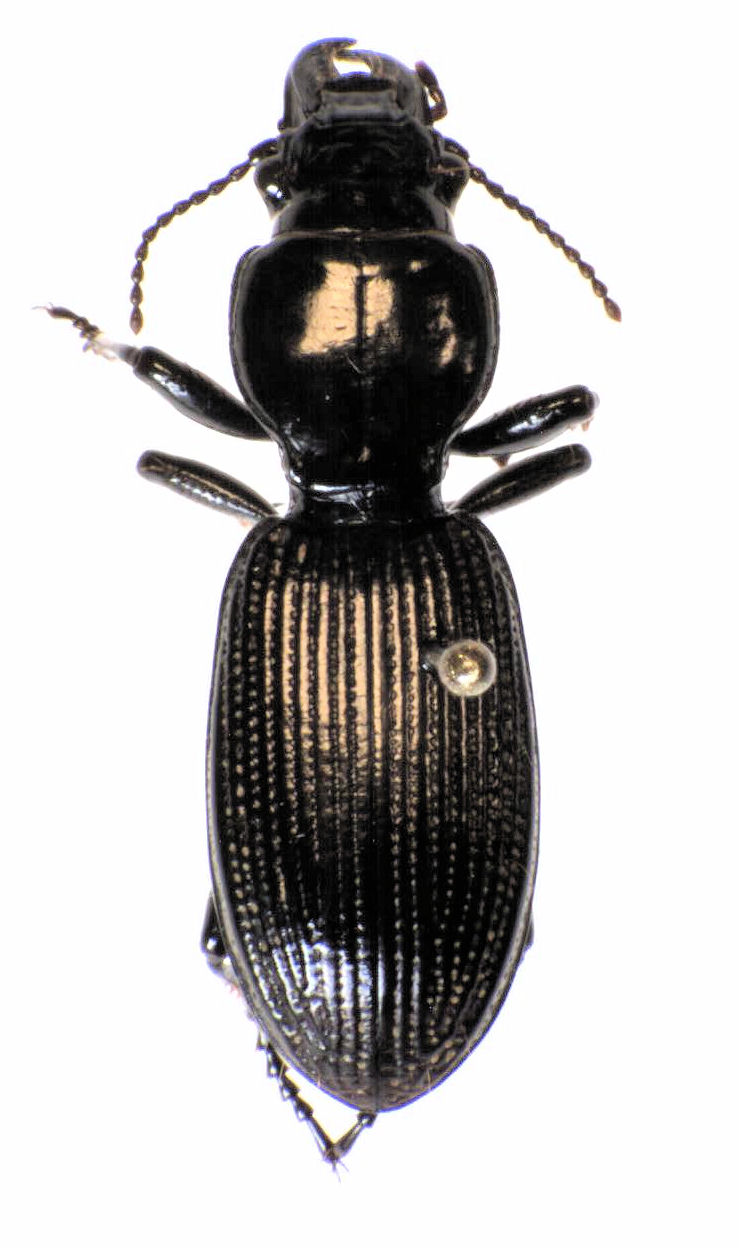
- Dorsal view of specimen

Conservation status
- Declining (NZ TCS)

Scientific classification
- Kingdom: Animalia
- Phylum: Arthropoda
- Class: Insecta
- Order: Coleoptera
- Suborder: Adephaga
- Family: Carabidae
- Genus: Mecodema
- Species: M. manaia

Binomial name
- Mecodema manaia Seldon & Leschen, 2011

= Mecodema manaia =

Species of beetle

Mecodema manaia is a medium-sized ground beetle species found in the native forests of Bream Head and Mt Manaia, Northland, New Zealand. This species shares the forests of Bream Head with a large-bodied species, Mecodema tewhara, with both inhabiting slightly different forest type.

== Diagnosis ==
Distinguished from other North Island Mecodema species by having:

1. the pronotal carina with 3–4 setae along each side (curvidens species group);
2. pronotum overall shape squared, midline poorly defined, medial impressions and microsculpture absent;
3. elytral interval 7 curved inwardly to parallel humeral angle;
4. ventrites 3 and 4 without setose punctures, ventrite 5 with 1 setose puncture each side of midline.

== Description ==
Length 24.5–28.7 mm (0.96–1.13 in), pronotal width 6.5–7.7 mm (0.26–0.30 in), elytral width 7.8–9.2 mm (0.31–0.36 in). Colour of entire body matte to glossy black.

== Natural history ==
Mecodema manaia is found in the native broadleaf forest, especially areas with deep leaf litter.

== Conservation status ==
Under the New Zealand Threat Classification System, this species is listed as "Declining".
