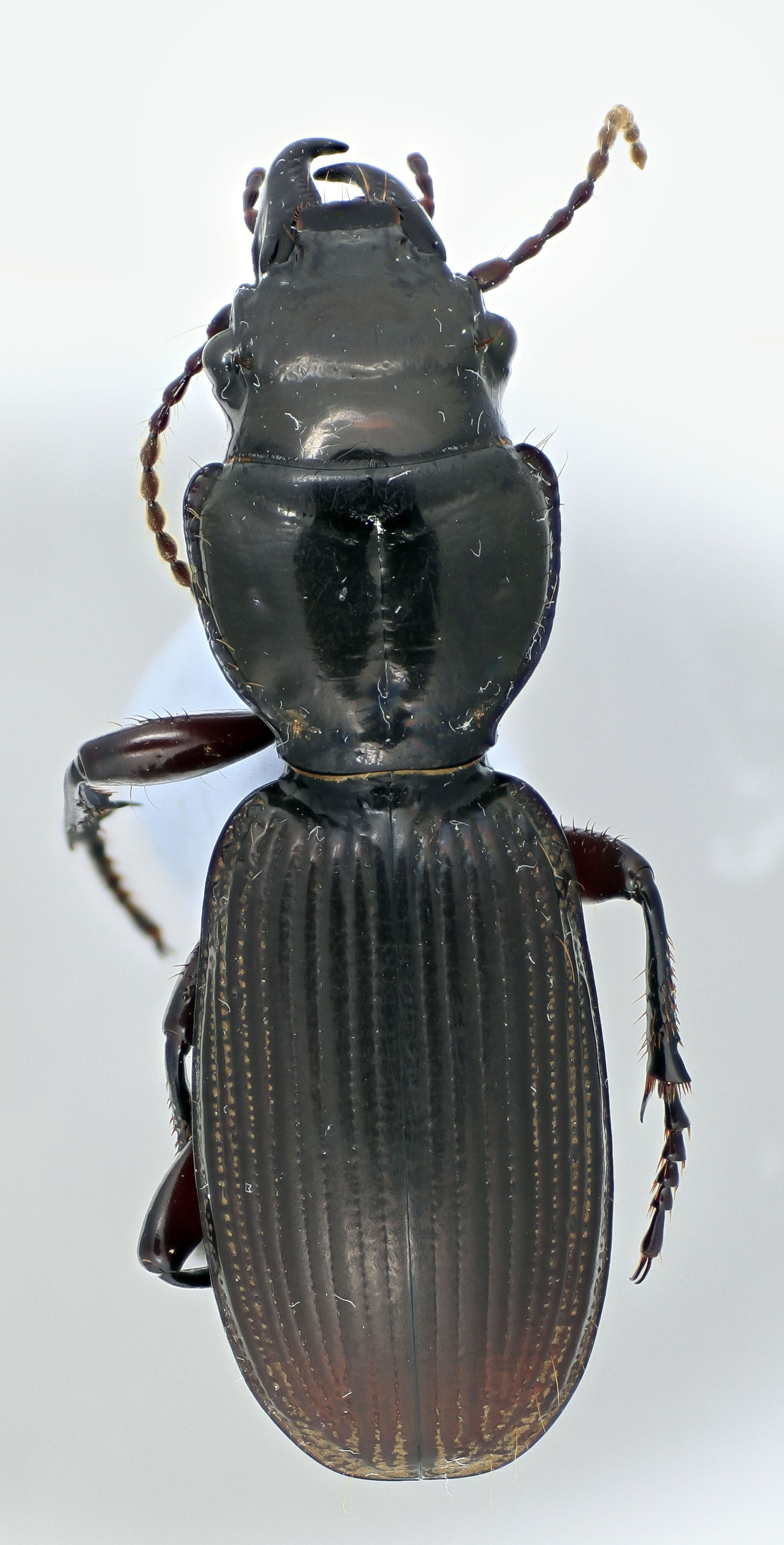
- Dorsal view of specimen

Scientific classification
- Kingdom: Animalia
- Phylum: Arthropoda
- Class: Insecta
- Order: Coleoptera
- Suborder: Adephaga
- Family: Carabidae
- Genus: Mecodema
- Species: M. mohi

Binomial name
- Mecodema mohi Seldon & Buckley, 2019

= Mecodema mohi =

Species of beetle

Mecodema mohi is a large-bodied (28–34.8 mm length; 8.4–11.5 mm width) ground beetle that is endemic to the Hawke's Bay, North Island, New Zealand. This species inhabits native forest fragments on the Maraetotara Plateau, and is named for its type locality, which is Mohi Bush Scenic Reserve. It is distinguishable from other Mecodema species in the area by the form of the apical portion of penis lobe, the weakly impressed and sparsely punctured vertexal groove on the back of the head.

== Natural history ==
Relatively abundant in Mohi Bush S. R. and is also found in some native bush fragments to the north and south along the Maraetotara Plateau. Mecodema mohi can be found under logs and rocks in the native forest, it is a nocturnal predator of other invertebrates on the forest floor.
