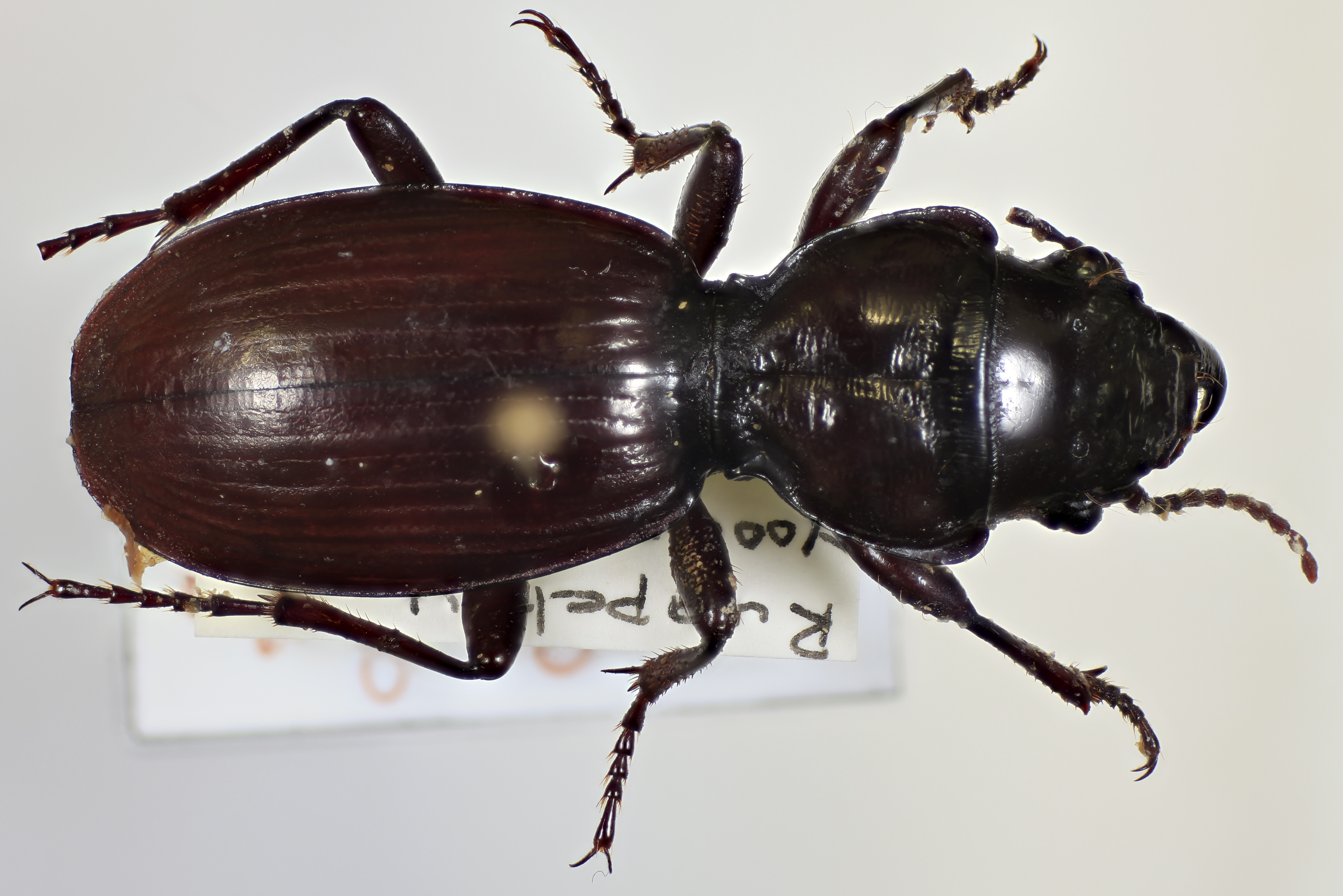
- Dorsal view of the male specimen (holotype)

Scientific classification
- Kingdom: Animalia
- Phylum: Arthropoda
- Class: Insecta
- Order: Coleoptera
- Suborder: Adephaga
- Family: Carabidae
- Genus: Mecodema
- Species: M. godzilla

Binomial name
- Mecodema godzilla Seldon & Buckley, 2019

= Mecodema godzilla =

Species of beetle

Mecodema godzilla is a large-bodied ground beetle endemic to Mt Ruapehu, North Island, New Zealand. It is generally found in the areas of tussock and low-growing alpine tree line, with a few specimens now recorded on iNaturalist

It was described from two specimens, which are housed in two different entomological collections, the Auckland Museum and Lincoln University.

== Diagnosis ==
Can be distinguished from other North Island Mecodema species by:

1. its size (34–36 mm long and 11.5–13 mm wide);
2. elytra truncated by steep apical slope;
3. lateral carina broad and reflexed upward the entire length.

== Description ==
Length 34.3–36.4 mm, pronotal width 10.1–11.2 mm, elytral width 11.7–12.9 mm. Colour of head and pronotum black to glossy black, elytra matte reddish-brown to matte black, ventrally (including legs) brown to matte black.

== Natural history ==
Found on the scree and tussock slopes of Mt Ruapehu.
