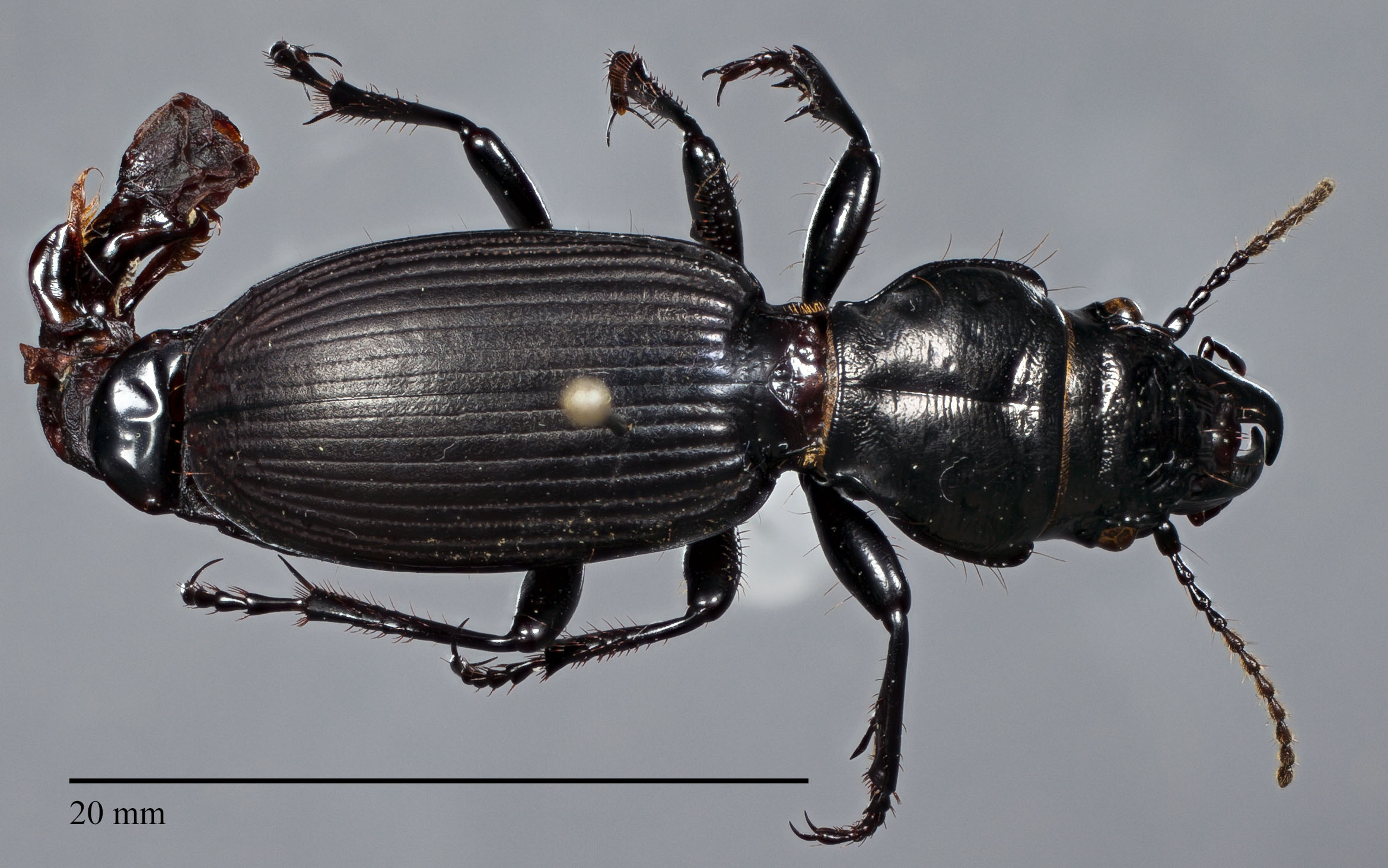
- Dorsal view Mecodema genesispotini

Scientific classification
- Kingdom: Animalia
- Phylum: Arthropoda
- Class: Insecta
- Order: Coleoptera
- Suborder: Adephaga
- Family: Carabidae
- Genus: Mecodema
- Species: M. genesispotini

Binomial name
- Mecodema genesispotini Seldon & Buckley, 2019

= Mecodema genesispotini =

Species of ground beetle

Mecodema genesispotini is a species of ground beetle found in a small native forest remnant, between paddocks and pine forest, in the Waimata Valley, northwest of Gisborne, New Zealand.

== Naming ==
The specific epithet is in honour of Genesis Potini.

== Diagnosis ==
It is distinguished from other North Island Mecodema species by having the vertexal groove (head) defined by rugose wrinkles and punctures along the entire groove; 8-10 setae along each side of the pronotum carina; the base of the pronotum has numerous light punctures between the pronotal foveae; plus, the distinctive shape of the apical portion of the penis lobe.

== Description ==
It has a length of 26.6–32 mm, pronotal width of 7.3–9.1 mm, and elytral width of 8.4–10.3 mm. Colour of head and pronotum matte to glossy black, abdomen and elytra matte dark reddish-brown to black; coxae and legs dark reddish-brown.
