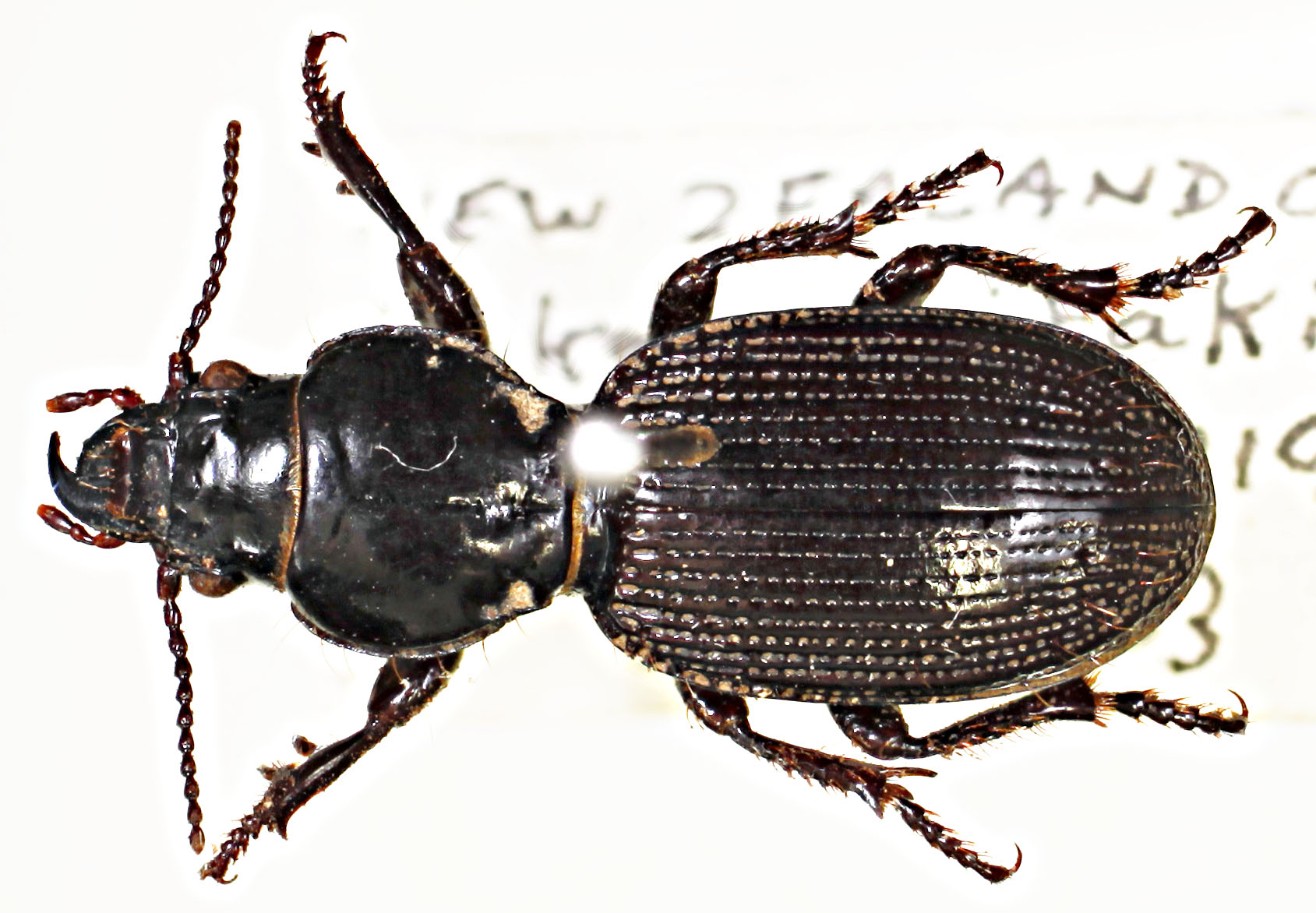
- Dorsal view of specimen

Scientific classification
- Kingdom: Animalia
- Phylum: Arthropoda
- Class: Insecta
- Order: Coleoptera
- Suborder: Adephaga
- Family: Carabidae
- Genus: Mecodema
- Species: M. aberrans

Binomial name
- Mecodema aberrans (Putzeys, 1868)

= Mecodema aberrans =

Species of beetle

Mecodema aberrans is a medium-sized (14.6–19.5 mm length, 5.3–6.5 mm width) ground beetle endemic to the South Island, New Zealand. This species is within the curvidens group and is one of three species that is a braided-river ecotype. It occurs in Otago and Canterbury.

== Description ==
The body colour of the species varies from black (dorsal) to brown (ventral), legs may be a red-brown. To reduce the abrasion of the ventral abdomen, ventrites 3–5 are covered in a large number of setae, which is one of the distinguishing features of this species. To further identify M. aberrans from other Mecodema species there is a difference in the size of the asetose punctures along elytral striae 9 in comparison to striae 1.
