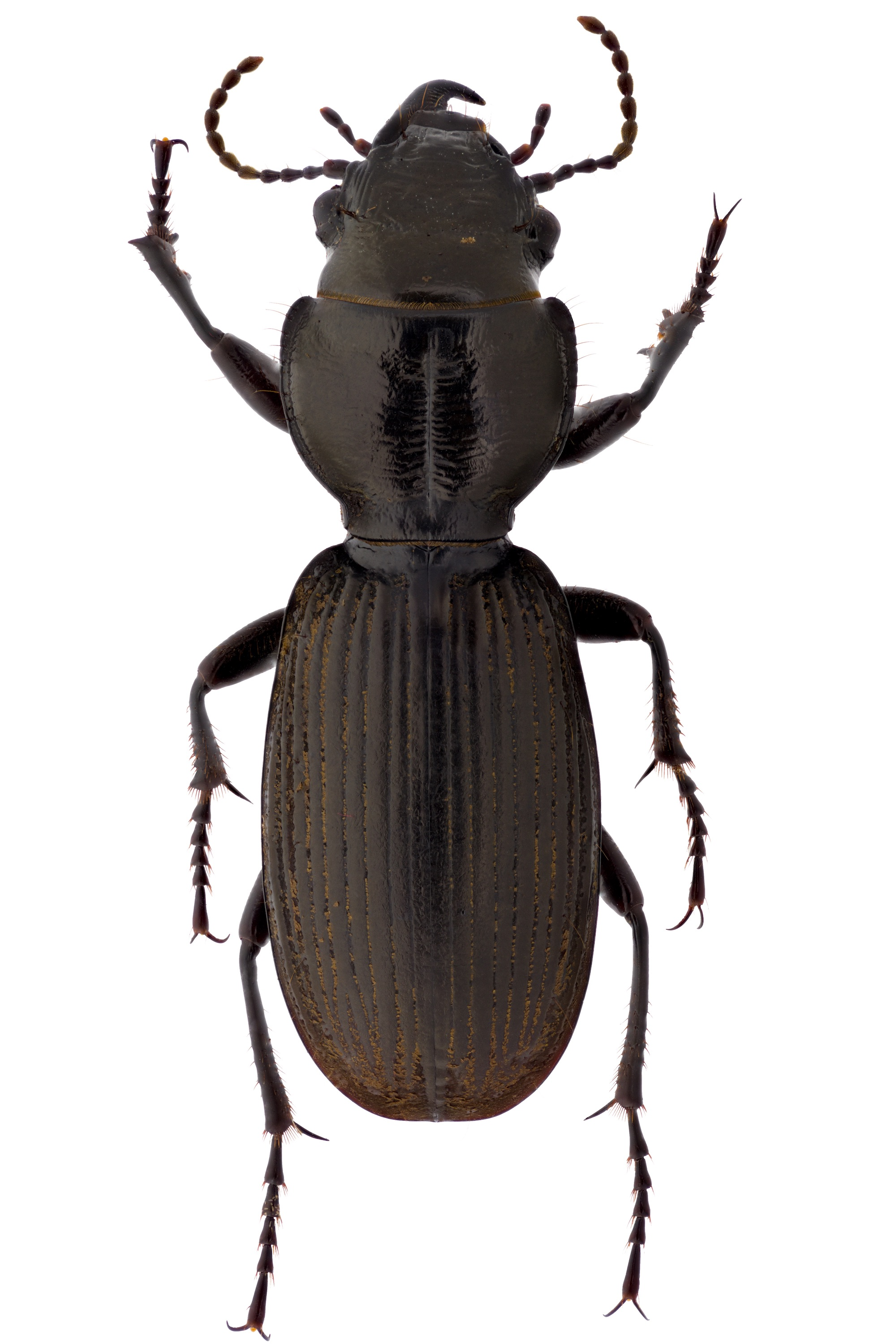
- Dorsal view of specimen

Scientific classification
- Kingdom: Animalia
- Phylum: Arthropoda
- Class: Insecta
- Order: Coleoptera
- Suborder: Adephaga
- Family: Carabidae
- Genus: Mecodema
- Species: M. oconnori

Binomial name
- Mecodema oconnori Broun, 1912

= Mecodema oconnori =

Species of beetle

Mecodema oconnori is a large-bodied species of ground beetle that is found mainly on the western regions of the North Island, New Zealand. It is mainly found in native forest habitats, both intact and fragmented, and on the edges of pine (Pinus radiata) plantations. Mecodema oconnori ranges from Otaki, Kapiti Coast to Raglan (on the western side of the Tararua and Ruahine Ranges), but is also found in the Manawatu Gorge and some other eastern localities.

== Diagnosis ==
Differs from other North Island Mecodema species by:

1. its large and robust body size;
2. elytral intervals 8 and 9 terminating short of basal margin;
3. apical shape of the penis lobe;
4. the setal distribution along the ventral edge of the left paramere.

== Description ==
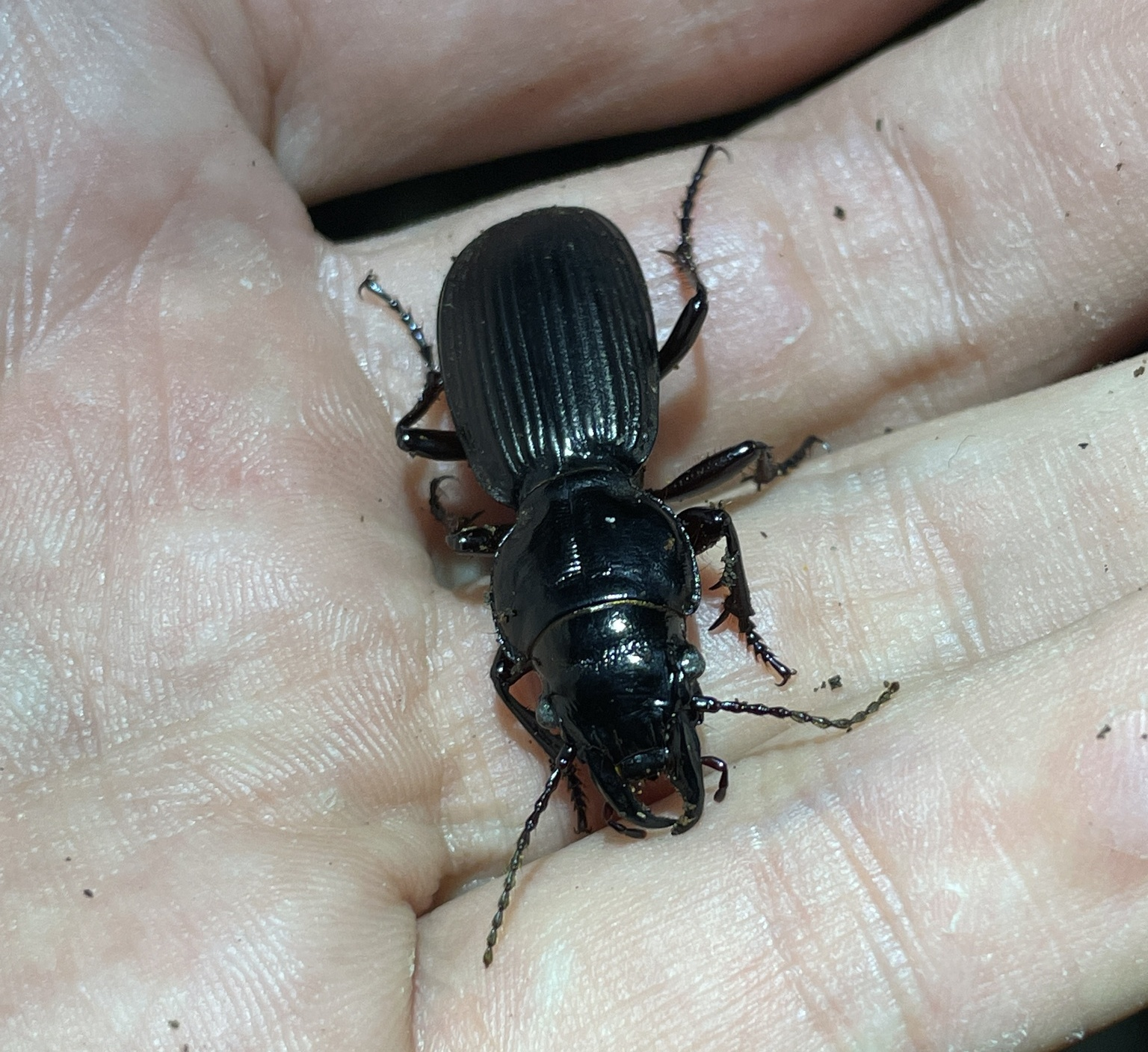
Live specimen in a hand.

Length 29–34 mm, pronotal width 7.9–10.4 mm, elytral width 9.3–11.7 mm. Colour of head and pronotum glossy black, elytra matte black, ventral surface dark reddish-brown to black, including legs (may be a darker red).

== Natural history ==
Mecodema oconnori is one of the few species of New Zealand carabids that has any published ecological or life history studies and/or observations. This species is relatively long-lived and only produces a small number of eggs in a season. The female broods the eggs, as well as the larvae, in a burrow beneath logs or rocks.
