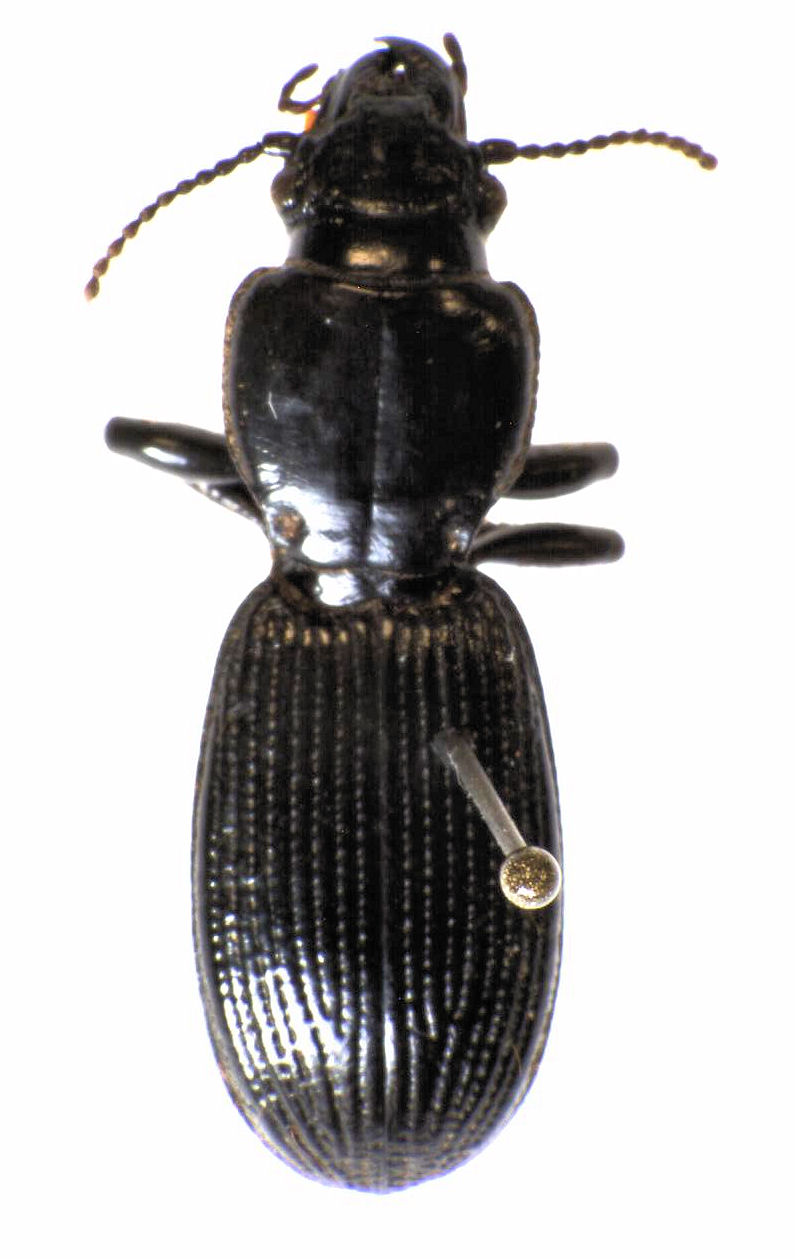

Conservation status
- Declining (NZ TCS)

Scientific classification
- Kingdom: Animalia
- Phylum: Arthropoda
- Class: Insecta
- Order: Coleoptera
- Suborder: Adephaga
- Family: Carabidae
- Genus: Mecodema
- Species: M. tenaki

Binomial name
- Mecodema tenaki Seldon & Leschen, 2011

= Mecodema tenaki =

Species of beetle

Mecodema tenaki is a species of ground beetle found in the Cape Reinga region, Northland, New Zealand. Under the New Zealand Threat Classification System, this species is listed as "Declining" with the qualifiers of "Conservation Dependent", "Range Restricted" and "Biologically Sparse".
