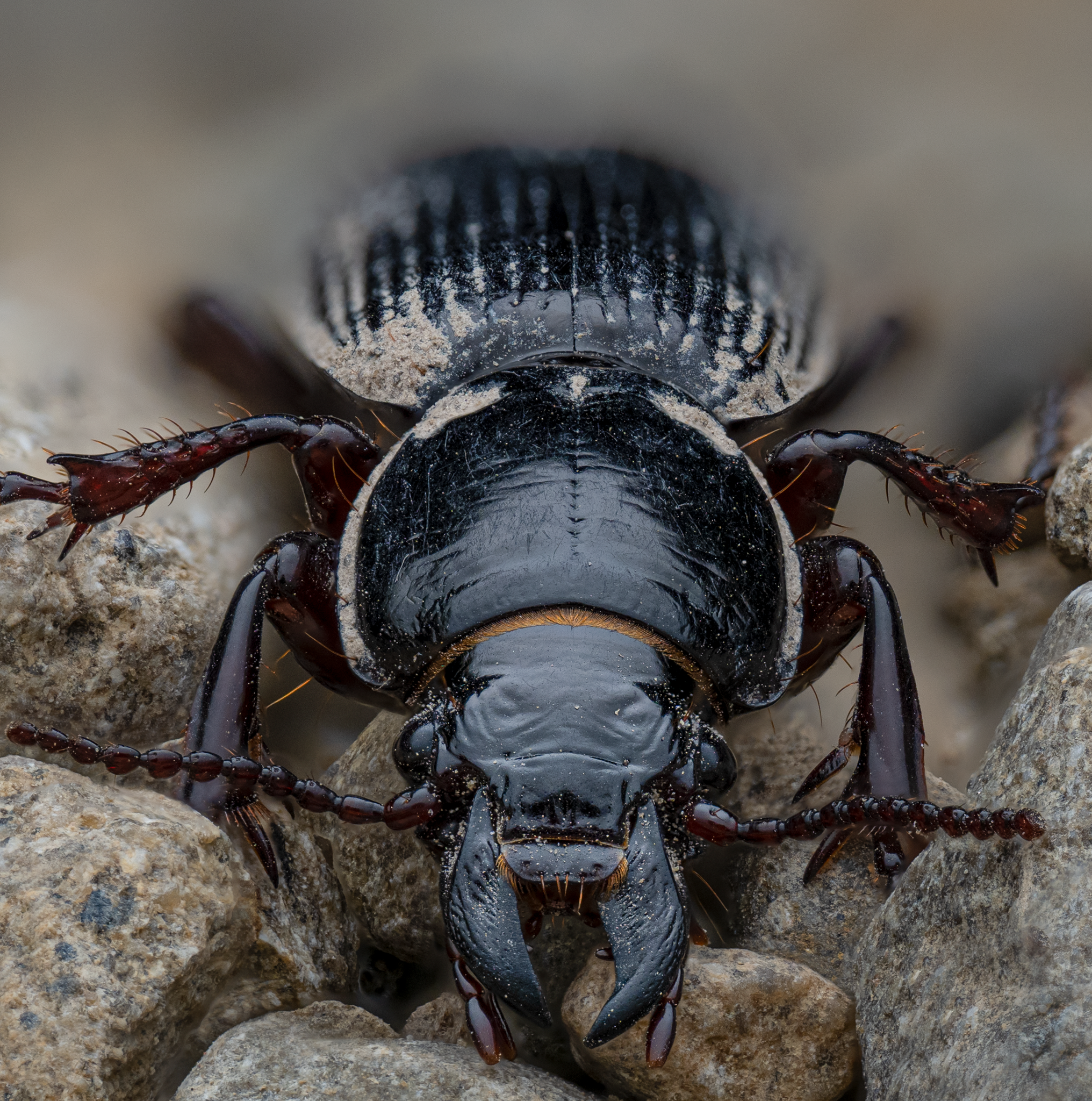
- Mecodema moniliferum

Scientific classification
- Kingdom: Animalia
- Phylum: Arthropoda
- Clade: Pancrustacea
- Class: Insecta
- Order: Coleoptera
- Suborder: Adephaga
- Family: Carabidae
- Subfamily: Broscinae
- Tribe: Broscini
- Subtribe: Nothobroscina
- Genus: Mecodema; Blanchard, 1853

Synonyms
- Brullea Laporte, 1867; Maoria Laporte, 1867; Metaglymma Bates, 1867

= Mecodema =

Genus of beetles

Mecodema is a genus of large flightless ground beetle (Carabidae) endemic to New Zealand. The genus is very diverse in comparison to the other three New Zealand genera (Diglymma, Oregus, Orthoglymma) within the subtribe Nothobroscina (tribe Broscini). Mecodema is geographically widespread across both the North and South Islands, as well as numerous offshore islands, including the Three Kings Is., Poor Knights Is., Aotea (Great Barrier Is.) and Hauturu (Little Barrier Is.), Kapiti Is., Stephens Is., Stewart Is., Chatham Is., Snares Is.

== Genus description ==
Head, frons and vertex often rugose and / or punctate, microsculpture or macrosculpture absent in some species groups (e.g., curvidens species); eyes prominent, almost hemispherical; a single supraorbital puncture on each side, bearing more than one setae; setose punctures of vertex absent; mandibles large, uniformly narrow to the pointed apex, sharply curved in the apical third, mandibles with a number of dorsal grooves and without a seta in the scrobe; mentum with median process, which is notched to strongly indentate (bifid); usually with 2 setiferous punctures (may be absent) below the process and generally with 4–8 setose (setiferous) punctures along the submentum sclerite; labial palpi with setae on the penultimate segment; terminal segments of all palpi slightly compressed, sub-cylindrical, truncate; ligula chitinous with a median carina, 2 apical setae present; the membranous paraglossae extended well beyond the apex of the ligula; stipes with 2–3 basal setae; antennomeres I–II glabrous, III–V with apical ring, VI–XI setose throughout; antennomeres I–III subcylindrical, IV–VII subglobose and slightly compressed. Prothoracic carina (pronotal lateral margin) distinct with an asymmetrical number of setae along each side, the last never at the posterior lateral sinuation (posterior angle); midline (median groove) and pronotal foveae (laterobasal depressions) always present; pronotal disc often with shallow depressions on each side of apical half. Elytra always striate; fused together along the suture; hind wings absent; a row of setose punctures on the 7th stria and another row (umbilical series) near the lateral carina (elytral margin). Legs slender, the protibia with a pointed apical prolongation on the outer side, greatly distally expanded to distally expanded and shovel-like; male and female tarsi identical, the basal 4 segments of the anterior tarsi are as broad as they are long, usually slightly asymmetrical.

Type species: Mecodema sculpturatum Blanchard 1853.

== Species and subspecies (106) ==
- Mecodema aberrans (Putzeys, 1868)
- Mecodema allani Fairburn, 1945
- Mecodema altum Fong & Seldon, 2026
- Mecodema alternans Laporte de Castelnau, 1867
  - Mecodema alternans hudsoni Broun, 1909
- Mecodema angustulum Broun, 1914
- Mecodema antarcticum (Laporte de Castelnau, 1867)
- Mecodema aoteanoho Seldon & Leschen, 2011
- Mecodema argentum Seldon & Buckley, 2019
- Mecodema atrox Britton, 1949
- Mecodema atuanui Seldon & Buckley, 2019
- Mecodema brittoni Townsend, 1965
- Mecodema bullatum Lewis, 1902
- Mecodema chaiup Seldon, 2015
- Mecodema chiltoni Broun, 1917
- Mecodema constrictum Broun, 1881
- Mecodema costellum Broun, 1903
  - Mecodema costellum gordonense Broun, 1917
  - Mecodema costellum lewisi Broun, 1908
  - Mecodema costellum obesum Townsend, 1965
- Mecodema costipenne Broun, 1914
- Mecodema crenicolle Castelnau, 1867
- Mecodema curvidens (Broun, 1915)
- Mecodema ducale Sharp, 1886
- Mecodema dunense Townsend, 1965
- Mecodema dunnorum Seldon & Buckley, 2019
- Mecodema dux Britton, 1949
- Mecodema elongatum Castelnau, 1867
- Mecodema femorale Broun, 1921
- Mecodema florae Britton, 1949
- Mecodema fulgidum Broun, 1881
- Mecodema genesispotini Seldon & Buckley, 2019
- Mecodema godzilla Seldon & Buckley, 2019
- Mecodema gourlayi Britton, 1949
- Mecodema haakuturi Seldon & Pou, 2024
- Mecodema haunoho Seldon & Leschen, 2011
- Mecodema hector Britton, 1949
- Mecodema howitti Castelnau, 1867
- Mecodema huttense Broun, 1915
- Mecodema impressum Castelnau, 1867
- Mecodema infimate Lewis, 1902
- Mecodema integratum Townsend, 1965
- Mecodema jacinda Seldon & Buckley, 2019
- Mecodema kahurangi Fong & Seldon, 2026
- Mecodema kipjac Seldon & Buckley, 2019
- Mecodema kokoroiho Seldon & Buckley, 2019
- Mecodema kokoromatua Seldon, Leschen & Liebherr, 2012
- Mecodema laeviceps Broun, 1904
- Mecodema laterale Broun, 1917
- Mecodema litoreum Broun, 1886
- Mecodema longicolle Broun, 1923
- Mecodema lucidum Castelnau, 1867
- Mecodema manaia Seldon & Leschen, 2011
- Mecodema metallicum Sharp, 1886
- Mecodema minax Britton, 1949
- Mecodema mohi Seldon & Buckley, 2019
- Mecodema moniliferum (Bates, 1867)
- Mecodema morio (Castelnau, 1867)
- Mecodema ngaiatonga Seldon & Buckley, 2019
- Mecodema ngaitahuhu Seldon & Buckley, 2019
- Mecodema nitidum Broun, 1903
- Mecodema oblongum (Broun, 1882)
- Mecodema oconnori Broun, 1912
- Mecodema oregoides (Broun, 1894)
- Mecodema papake Seldon & Buckley, 2019
- Mecodema parataiko Seldon & Leschen, 2011
- Mecodema pavidum Townsend, 1965
- Mecodema perexiguum Seldon & Buckley, 2019
- Mecodema persculptum Broun, 1915
- Mecodema pluto Britton, 1949
- Mecodema politanum Broun, 1917
- Mecodema ponaiti Seldon & Leschen, 2011
- Mecodema proximum Britton, 1949
- Mecodema puiakium Johns & Ewers in Johns, 2007
- Mecodema pulchellum Townsend, 1965
- Mecodema punctatum (Laporte de Castelnau, 1867)
- Mecodema punctellum Broun, 1921
- Mecodema puncticolle Broun, 1915 [?=Mecodema sculpturatum Blanchard, 1843]
- Mecodema quoinense Broun, 1912
- Mecodema rectolineatum Laporte de Castelnau, 1867
- Mecodema regulus Britton, 1964
- Mecodema rex Britton, 1949
- Mecodema rugiceps Sharp, 1886
  - Mecodema rugiceps anomalum Townsend, 1965
- Mecodema rusticulus Seldon & Buckley, 2019
- Mecodema scitulum Broun, 1894
- Mecodema sculpturatum Blanchard, 1843
- Mecodema simplex Castelnau, 1867
- Mecodema spiniferum Broun, 1880
- Mecodema striatum Broun, 1904
- Mecodema strictum Britton, 1949
- Mecodema temata Seldon & Buckley, 2019
- Mecodema tenaki Seldon & Leschen, 2011
- Mecodema teparawhau Seldon & Buckley, 2019
- Mecodema teroroa Seldon & Buckley, 2019
- Mecodema tewhara Seldon & Buckley, 2019
- Mecodema tibiale (Laporte de Castelnau, 1867)
- Mecodema tititea Fong & Seldon, 2026
- Mecodema tuhoe Seldon & Buckley, 2019
- Mecodema undecimus Seldon & Buckley, 2019
- Mecodema validum Broun, 1923
- Mecodema venator Broun, 1883
- Mecodema wharekahika Seldon & Buckley, 2019
- Mecodema xylanthrax Seldon & Buckley, 2019
- Mecodema yconomus Seldon & Buckley, 2019
- Mecodema zonula Seldon & Buckley, 2019
