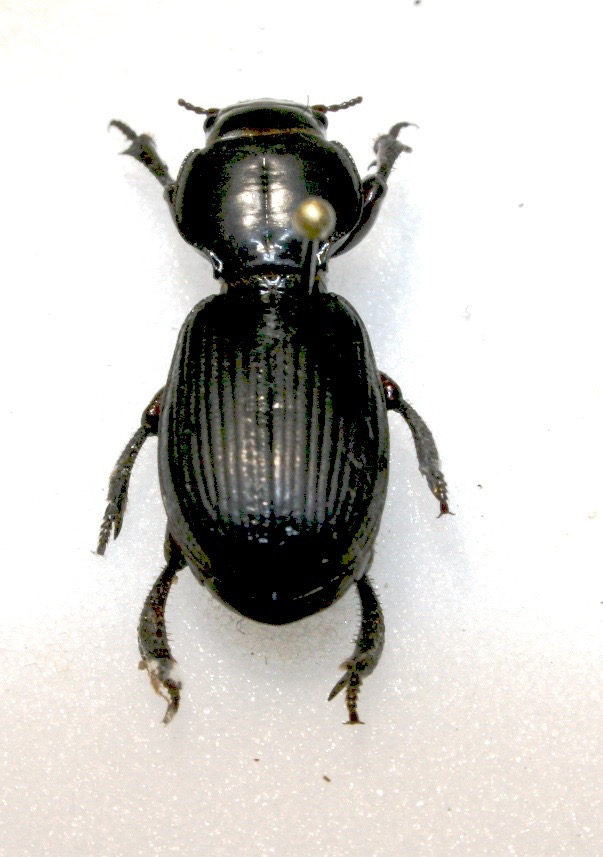
- Specimen from Castlecliff Beach, Whanganui, New Zealand

Scientific classification
- Kingdom: Animalia
- Phylum: Arthropoda
- Clade: Pancrustacea
- Class: Insecta
- Order: Coleoptera
- Suborder: Adephaga
- Family: Carabidae
- Genus: Mecodema
- Species: M. antarcticum

Binomial name
- Mecodema antarcticum (Laporte, 1867)

Synonyms
- Brullea antarctica Laporte, 1867; Mecodema antarctica (Laporte, 1867)

= Mecodema antarcticum =

Species of beetles

Mecodema antarcticum is a carnivorous carabid beetle that burrows in sand above the high tide mark on New Zealand sandy beaches. First described by Francis de Laporte de Castelnau in 1867 as Brullea antarctica, it has since been reassigned to Mecodema by Seldon & Buckley, 2019.

Diagnosis.

Mecodema antarcticum is distinguishable from all other North Island Mecodema species by having: 1, greatly expanded protibia and mesotibia; 2, ventrites with numerous setose punctures; 3, the pronotum and elytra are truncated; all adaptations for a psammaphilous lifestyle (Seldon & Buckley, 2019).

== Description ==
Mecodema antarcticum is up to 25 mm in length, glabrous reddish brown to black with a distinct "waist" or narrowing between pronotum and abdomen (peduncle), like all Mecodema. Indeed, recent DNA analysis places it within that genus, and within curvidens species group. Its distinctive differences in body shape and leg morphology are adaptations to burrowing in sand.

This species legs are well-adapted for digging in sand with greatly expanded coxa, femur and tibia: all tibia are greatly expanded at their distal ends, and the middle and hind pairs are also strongly curved. Other features consistent with dwelling in and on sand are the short antennae, large curved mandibles, and a rather boxy shape in contrast to the longer and more elegant forest Mecodema species. The abdomen of M. antarcticum is covered in long setae to further protect it from abrasion (Seldon & Buckley 2019). Its larval form was unknown for some time, and was first described in 1978.

== Ecology ==
Mecodema antarcticum is found in the supralittoral or splash zone of sandy beaches around the New Zealand coast, underneath logs or stones, hiding in the sand during the day and emerging at night to feed. It was described by George Hudson as "usually rare", but is a secretive burrowing beetle, and occasionally is discovered in reasonable numbers. It was rediscovered by schoolchildren on the Whanganui coast in 2006 after not being recorded for many years.

Mecodema antarcticum has been recorded being heavily preyed on by katipō spiders, and it may be threatened by the introduced South African spider Steatoda capensis, either as a predator or competitor.
