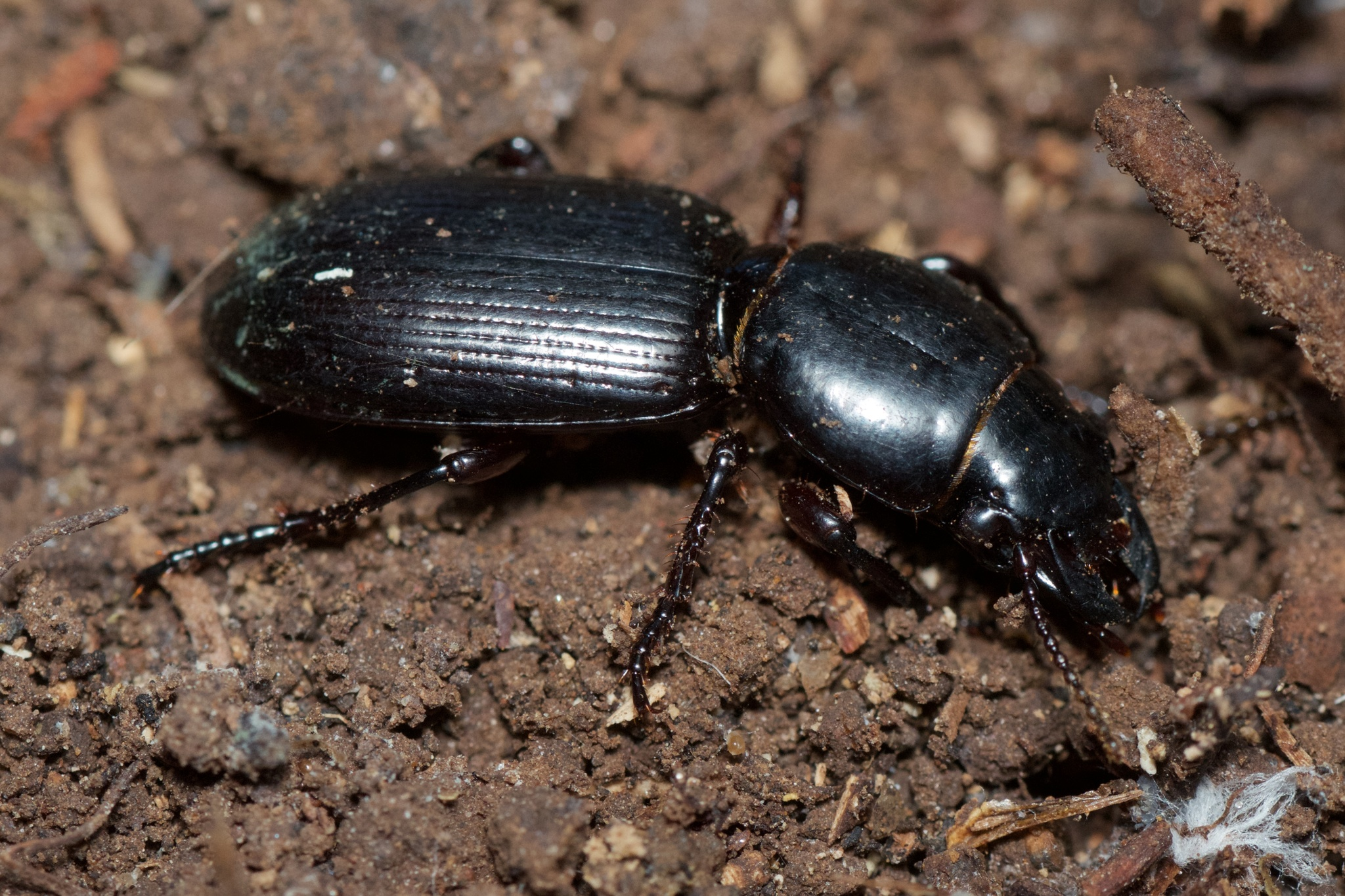
- M. oregoides in Ohinetahi Reserve, Port Hills

Scientific classification
- Kingdom: Animalia
- Phylum: Arthropoda
- Clade: Pancrustacea
- Class: Insecta
- Order: Coleoptera
- Suborder: Adephaga
- Family: Carabidae
- Genus: Mecodema
- Species: M. oregoides

Binomial name
- Mecodema oregoides Broun, 1894

Synonyms
- Metaglymma oregoide Broun, 1894

= Mecodema oregoides =

Species of beetle

Mecodema oregoides is a small-bodied ground beetle endemic to New Zealand, and is the southernmost species of the curvidens group. They are moderately sized black beetles that reach up to 16mm (0.63 in) in length. The beetles only occur on Banks Peninsula in Canterbury, where they occupy a range of habitats. Like many other ground beetles, they are nocturnal predators. The adults occur all year round, but are most common from November to March.

== Taxonomy ==
This species was originally described in 1894 as Metaglymma oregoide by Thomas Broun. The specimen he used was collected from a garden in the Christchurch region. The lectotype is stored in the Natural History Museum of London. In 1949, the species underwent a taxonomic revision. In this revision, the species was moved into the genus Mecodema and assigned to the sulcatum species group. It was most recently given an updated description in 2011, in which it was recognised as belong to the curvidens species group, of which it is the southernmost.

== Description ==
As adults, the beetles are 12-16mm (0.47-0.63 in) in length. The body is a uniform black colour and is convex in shape. The fovea of the prothorax is not well defined. The ridge of the prothorax is narrow and reaches the anterior angle. The striations of the elytra are evenly spread out and have small punctures. Setiferous punctures (depressions in the body with a hair sticking out of them) are present on the clypeus (both sides of it) and on the third, fourth and fifth ventrites (segments on the underside of the abdomen).

== Distribution and habitat ==
This species is endemic to New Zealand. It is only found on Banks Peninsula in the Canterbury region of the South Island. They are known to occur in native habitat such as forests, scrublands, and tussock grasslands, but also occur in human modified habitat such as gardens and farmland.

== Behaviour ==
Based on the morphology of their mouthparts, they are presumed to be predators. They are fairly slow runners that hide under logs and stones during the day, only coming out at night.

== Life history ==
The adults occur throughout the year. However, they are reported to be more common from November to March. They reportedly lay their eggs during autumn. In one study, the female to male sex ratio was reported to be about 1 to 0.8.
