= Mecodema tuhoe =

Scientific classification
- Kingdom: Animalia
- Phylum: Arthropoda
- Clade: Pancrustacea
- Class: Insecta
- Order: Coleoptera
- Suborder: Adephaga
- Family: Carabidae
- Genus: Mecodema
- Species: M. tuhoe

Binomial name
- Mecodema tuhoe Seldon & Buckley, 2019

Species of beetle

Mecodema tuhoe is a species of ground beetle endemic to New Zealand.
