= Mecodema crenicolle =

Scientific classification
- Kingdom: Animalia
- Phylum: Arthropoda
- Clade: Pancrustacea
- Class: Insecta
- Order: Coleoptera
- Suborder: Adephaga
- Family: Carabidae
- Genus: Mecodema
- Species: M. crenicolle

Binomial name
- Mecodema crenicolle Laporte de Castelnau, 1867

Synonyms
- Mecodema crenaticolle Redtenbacher, 1868; Mecodema rugicolle Broun, 1882; Mecodema variolosum Broun, 1903; Mecodema lineatum Broun, 1894

Species of beetle

Mecodema crenicolle is a species of ground beetle endemic to New Zealand. It is found only on the North Island of New Zealand where it occurs in native forest, pine plantation and pasture habitats. As an adult, it is a medium-large beetle with a length of 22–29 mm. It is black with distinctive puncture marks over much of its body and is similar to Mecodema venator, its sister species. It was first described in taxonomic literature by French naturalist François-Louis Laporte de Castelnau in 1867. Like other Mecodema, it is flightless and a predator of invertebrates.

== Taxonomy ==
This species was first described in modern taxonomic literature by French naturalist François-Louis Laporte de Castelnau in 1867 from a specimen collected in the Auckland region. The holotype (a single specimen on which the species description is based) is stored in the Natural History Museum, Vienna. The species was unknowingly described again under four additional names: Mecodema crenaticolle by Austrian entomologist Ludwig Redtenbacher in 1868, then as Mecodema rugicolle, Mecodema lineatum and Mecomedema variolosum by Scottish entomologist Thomas Broun in 1882, 1894 and 1903 respectively.

In 1949, British entomologist Everard Baldwin Britton revised the species. During this, he recognised both Mecodema venator and Mecodema variolosum as synonyms, meaning they are the same species of M. crenicolle. However, this was undone in 2026, when the M. venator species was reinstated, with South Island populations of M. crenicolle being recognised as M. venator. The 2026 revision also recognised Mecodema crenaticolle as a synonym of M. crenicolle, among others.

== Description ==
Mecodema crenicolle is a medium-large ground beetle with a body length of 21–28 mm and coloured reddish brown to black. As a member of the ducale group of Mecodema species, the pronotum carina (a raised ridge on the thorax) is strongly crenulated, meaning it is notched. The elytra (hardened plates that cover the abdomen) have numerous grooves running vertically down their surface which are termed striae. Of these, the outer striae are covered in stellate (star-shaped) punctures which do not have hairs in them, like some other punctures. These punctures are irregularly placed and deeper in the outer striae. A distinguishing character of M. crenicolle from its sister species, M. venator is that the punctures in elytral stria 7 are larger than stria 8 and cannot be distinguished at the base of the elytra.

== Distribution and habitat ==
This species is only found in the North Island of New Zealand. It is found as far north as the Hunua Ranges, southeast of Auckland, and as far south as the Wellington region. Throughout this distribution, it lives in native forest, pine plantations and pasture. It can be found from lowland to mountainous altitudes.

== Ecology ==
Mecodema crenicolle is mainly nocturnal and hides under logs during the day. The adult can be found all year round and is flightless. It is a predator of other invertebrates. It has been fed scarab beetle adults and larvae in captive conditions. Some individuals can be found infested with mites.
