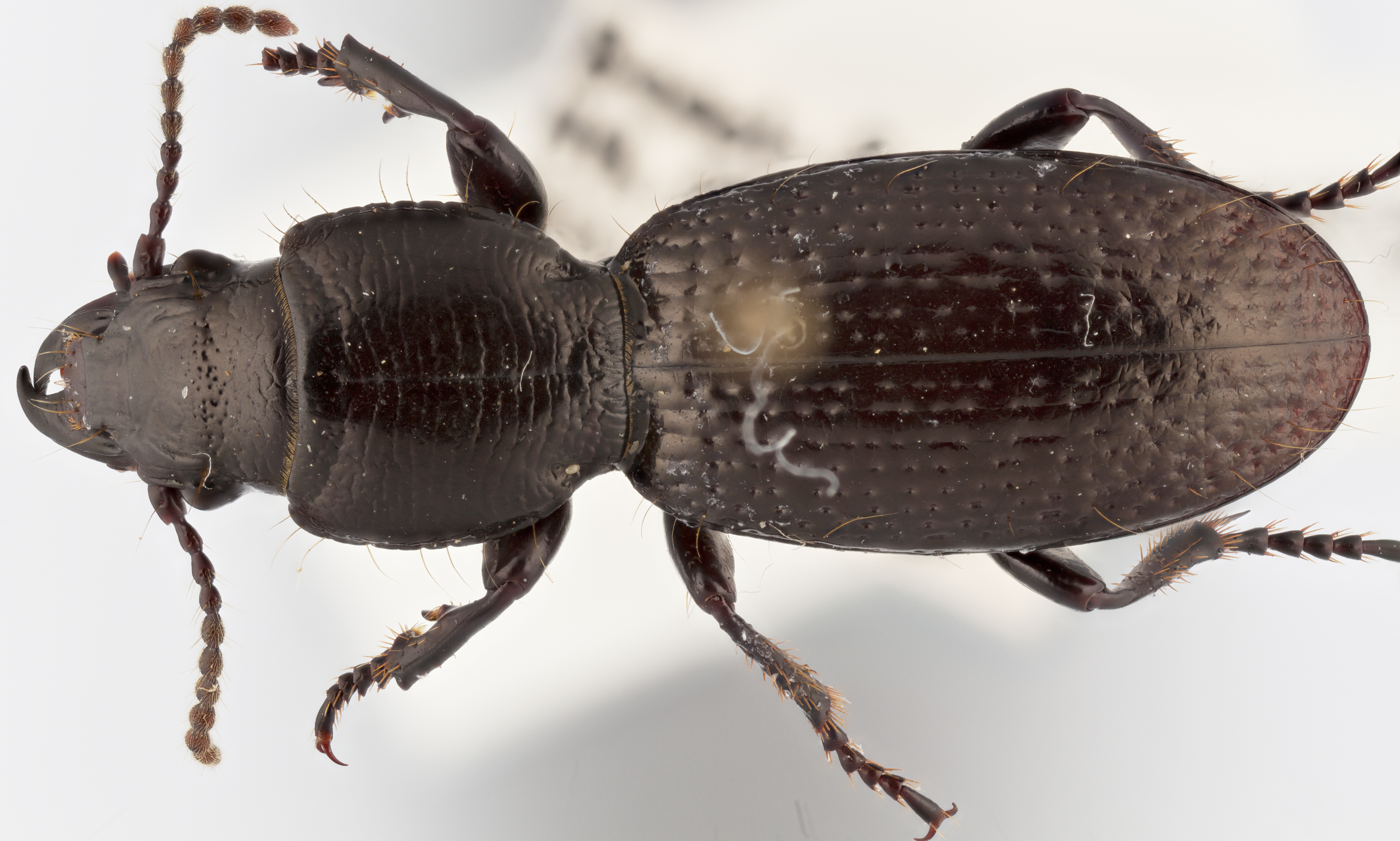
- Dorsal view of Mecodema florae

Scientific classification
- Kingdom: Animalia
- Phylum: Arthropoda
- Class: Insecta
- Order: Coleoptera
- Suborder: Adephaga
- Family: Carabidae
- Genus: Mecodema
- Species: M. florae

Binomial name
- Mecodema florae Britton, 1949

= Mecodema florae =

Species of insect

Mecodema florae is an endemic New Zealand ground beetle, which was described by Britton in 1949. It is one of the few species within the genus Mecodema that has a range that includes both the North and South Islands. In the North Island it is found from Mt Taranaki (west) to Boundary Stream Mainland Island (Hawke's Bay) then southwards from the Taupo Line to Buller, northwest Nelson, South Island. Mecodema florae shares this range with its sister taxon M. longicolle, which is relatively similar in external morphology, but the male genitalia are different.

== Diagnosis ==
Distinguishable from other North Island Mecodema species by having:

1. vertexal groove shallow, defined entirely by obsolescent punctures;
2. overall shape of pronotum ovate, prothoracic carina setae to sinuation;
3. proepisternum with numerous punctures in short grooves (deep wrinkles);
4. distinctive shape of apical portion of the penis lobe.

== Description ==
Length 17.5–19.5 mm, pronotal width 3.9–5.1 mm, elytral width 4.7–6.1 mm. Colour of the body dorsally is matte black, may be reddish-brown, ventrally dark reddish-brown.
