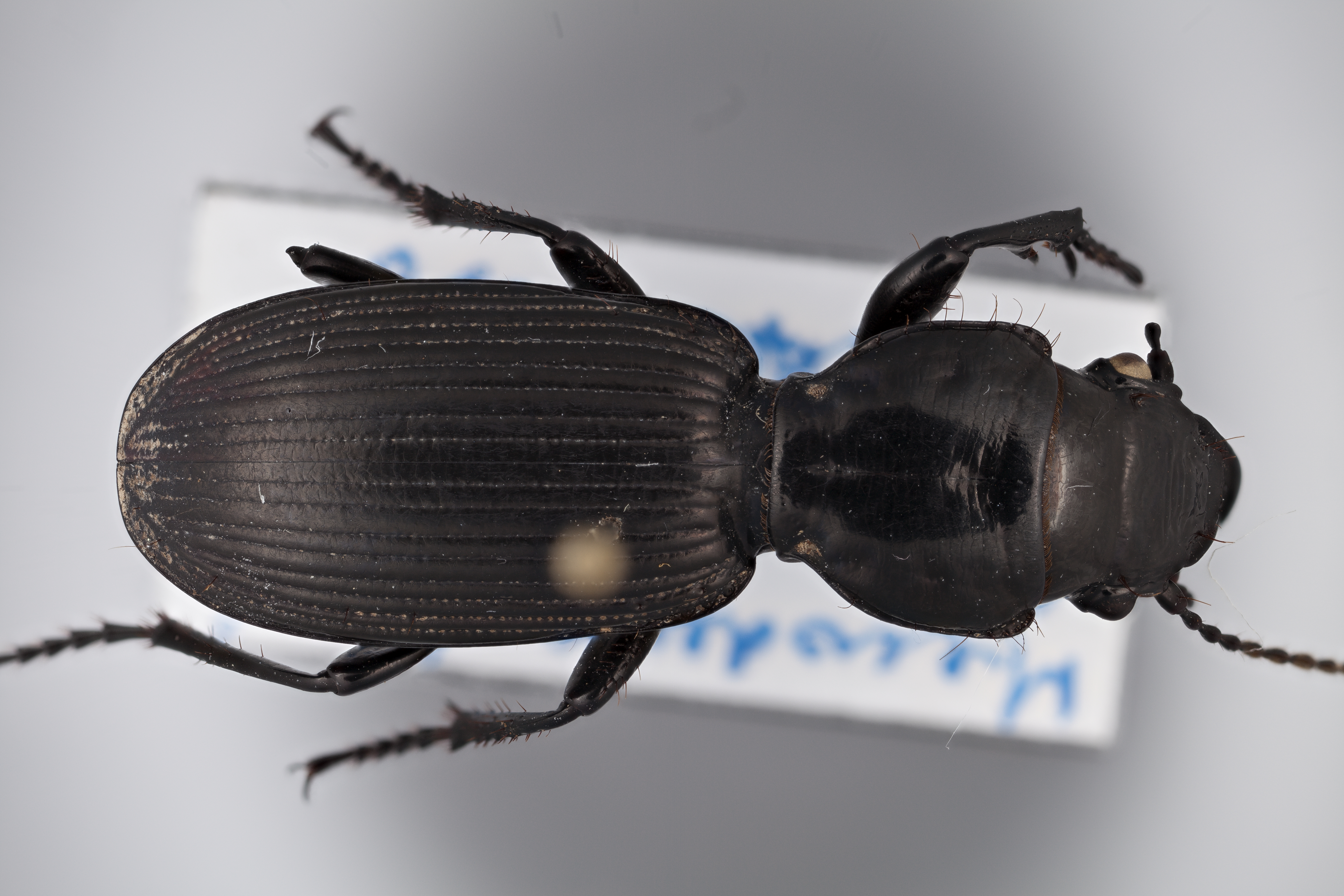
- Dorsal view of Mecodema dunnorum

Scientific classification
- Kingdom: Animalia
- Phylum: Arthropoda
- Class: Insecta
- Order: Coleoptera
- Suborder: Adephaga
- Family: Carabidae
- Genus: Mecodema
- Species: M. dunnorum

Binomial name
- Mecodema dunnorum Seldon & Buckley, 2019
- Known native range

= Mecodema dunnorum =

New Zealand beetle species

Mecodema dunnorum is a large-bodied ground beetle in the Mecodema genus found in some native forest remnants (e.g., Remiger's Bush Scenic Reserve and Dunn's Bush Scenic Reserve) in the Puhoi area, north Auckland, New Zealand. It is one of six endemic Mecodema species that are found in the Auckland entomological region, as per Crosby et al. 1976.

This beetle was named after Val Dunn and her late husband Arthur Dunn for their conservation work in the Puhoi-Warkworth areas of north Auckland. Both the bush reserves were covenanted by the Dunn family so that there are well established native forest remnants south of the Puhoi River.

== Identification ==
Differing from other North Island Mecodema species by the:

1. vertexal groove shallow, more impressed laterally, unpunctured, but large dimples laterally;
2. prothoracic carina broad the entire length, smooth with 14–17 setae along each side;
3. distinctive shape of apical portion of the penis lobe.
