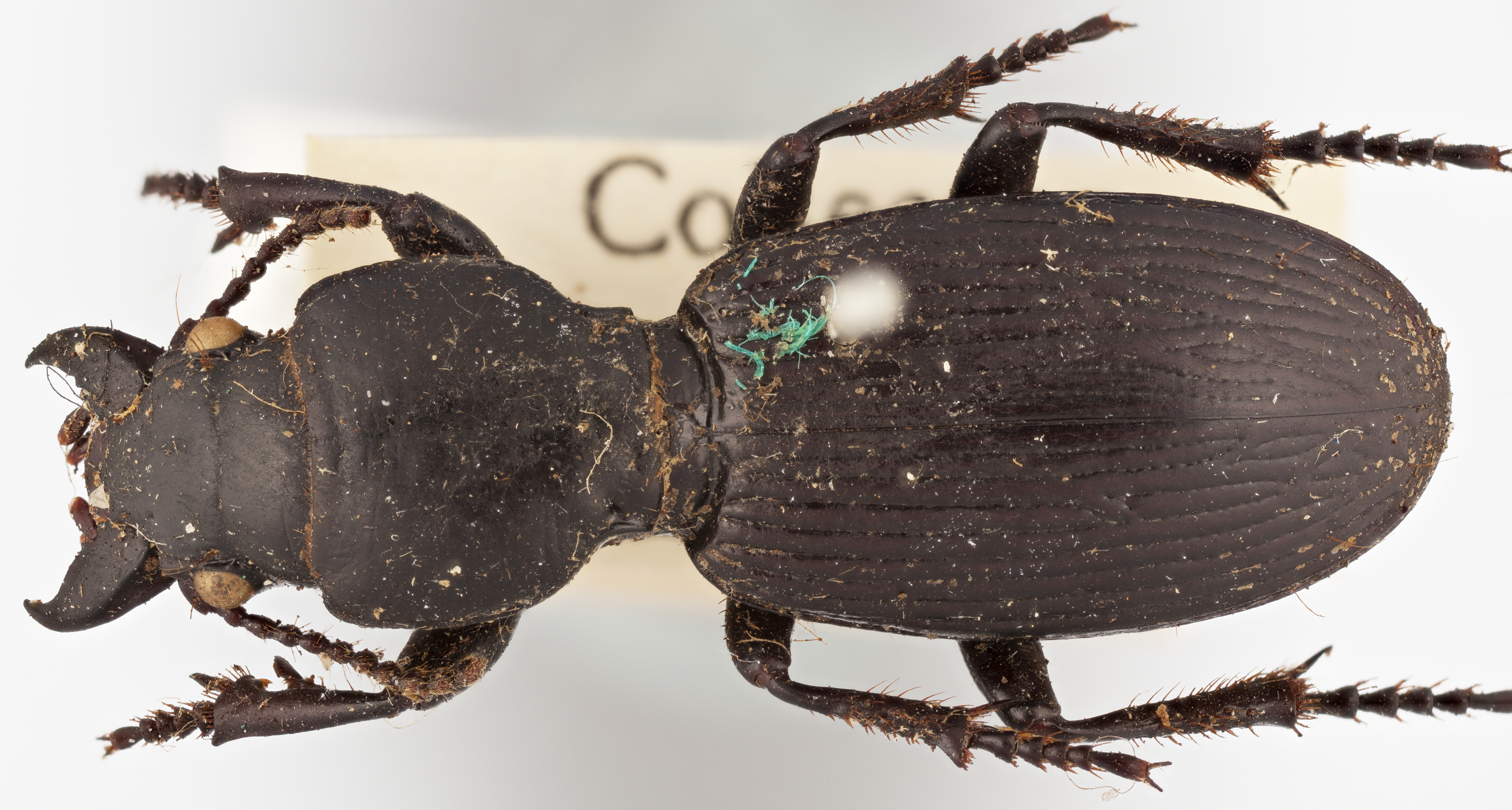

Conservation status
- Not Threatened (NZ TCS)

Scientific classification
- Kingdom: Animalia
- Phylum: Arthropoda
- Class: Insecta
- Order: Coleoptera
- Suborder: Adephaga
- Family: Carabidae
- Genus: Mecodema
- Species: M. curvidens

Binomial name
- Mecodema curvidens Broun, 1915

= Mecodema curvidens =

Species of beetle

Mecodema curvidens Broun is a medium-bodied ground beetle that is geographically widespread throughout the central areas of the North Island, New Zealand, which includes the entomological regions of Auckland (AK), Waikato (WO), Coromandel (CL), Bay of Plenty (BP), Taupo (TO), Rangitikei (RI), Whanganui (WI), Hawkes Bay (HB) and Wellington (WN). Recently, the species M. occiputale Broun was synonymised under M. curvidens (Seldon & Buckley 2019). Mecodema curvidens is relatively common through its range except in the southern area of the Hunua Ranges (Auckland) and Wellington regions.

== Diagnosis ==
Distinguished from other North Island Mecodema species by having:

1. pronotal carina with 4–6 setae each side (curvidens species group);
2. a vertexal groove that is narrow and defined entire length;
3. distinctive form of the basal lobe and setal distribution along ventral edge of the left paramere.

== Description ==
Length 18–26 mm, pronotal width 5.4–7.53 mm, elytral width 6.13–8.56 mm. Colour of entire body glossy to matte black, except coxae to tarsi reddish-brown to black.

== Conservation status ==
Under the New Zealand Threat Classification System, this species is listed as "Not Threatened".
