= Monteremita =

Scientific classification
- Kingdom: Animalia
- Phylum: Arthropoda
- Clade: Pancrustacea
- Class: Insecta
- Order: Coleoptera
- Suborder: Adephaga
- Family: Carabidae
- Subfamily: Broscinae
- Tribe: Broscini
- Subtribe: Nothobroscina
- Genus: Monteremita; Seldon & Holwell, 2019
- Species: M. asymetrica

Binomial name
- Monteremita asymetrica (Fauvel, 1903)

Synonyms
- Percosoma asymetricum Fauvel, 1903; Monteremita asymmetrica (Csiki, 1928); Percosoma asymmetricum Csiki, 1928; Percolestus asymetricus (Fauvel, 1903)

Genus of beetles

The beetle genus Moneremita is one of the 10 genera within the Gondwanan-distributed subtribe Nothobroscina, endemic to New Caledonia. The genus is monotypic, with the only species being Moneremita asymetrica, which was described from two specimens, one male and one female. Before the description of Monteremita by Seldon & Holwell (2019), this species had been placed in a few different Australian genera, including Percosoma, Percolestus and Eurylychnus.
