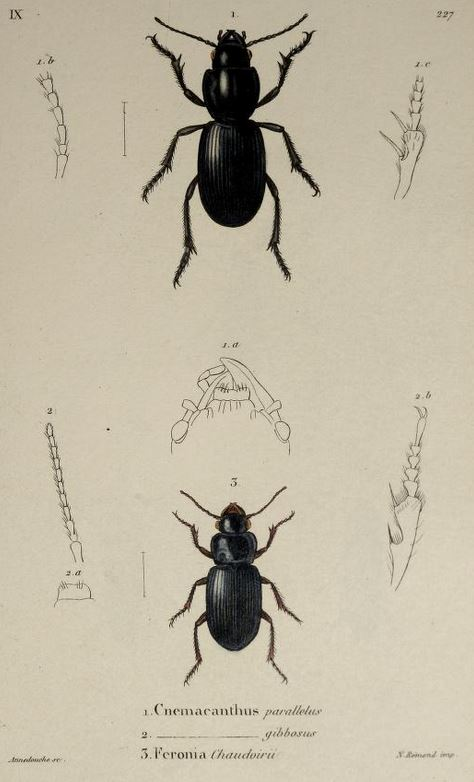
- Barypus parallelus at top (Fig. 1, as Cnemacanthus parallelus)

Scientific classification
- Kingdom: Animalia
- Phylum: Arthropoda
- Class: Insecta
- Order: Coleoptera
- Suborder: Adephaga
- Family: Carabidae
- Subfamily: Broscinae
- Tribe: Broscini
- Subtribe: Barypina; Jeannel, 1941

= Barypina =

Subtribe of beetles

The subtribe Barypina is a group of beetles in the Broscini tribe of Carabidae (the ground beetles) and is found throughout South America.

== Description ==
Barypina has two genera:

- Barypus: 3 subgenera; 24 species.
- Bembidiomorphum: 2 species.
