= Axonya =

Scientific classification
- Kingdom: Animalia
- Phylum: Arthropoda
- Class: Insecta
- Order: Coleoptera
- Suborder: Adephaga
- Family: Carabidae
- Subfamily: Broscinae
- Tribe: Broscini
- Subtribe: Axonyina
- Genus: Axonya; Andrewes, 1923

Genus of beetles

Axonya is a genus of ground beetle in the subfamily Broscinae. The genus was described by Herbert Edward Andrewes in 1923 with species being found across Southern Asia and containing the following species:

- Axonya championi Andrewes, 1923
- Axonya farsica Dostal and Zettel, 1999
- Axonya similis Dostal and Zettel, 1999
