= Eobroscus =

Scientific classification
- Kingdom: Animalia
- Phylum: Arthropoda
- Class: Insecta
- Order: Coleoptera
- Suborder: Adephaga
- Family: Carabidae
- Subfamily: Broscinae
- Tribe: Broscini
- Subtribe: Broscina
- Genus: Eobroscus; Kryzhanovskij, 1951

Type species
- Eobroscus richteri Kryzhanovskij, 1951

Synonyms
- Tosawabroscus Uéno, 1953; Orobroscus Morita, 1990

Genus of beetles

Eobroscus is a genus of beetles in the family Carabidae which was circumscribed by Oleg Leonidovich Kryzhanovsky in 1951. Its species are found in Russia, China, Korea, Japan, Taiwan, Bhutan, and Vietnam. As of 2017, it contains the following three species:

- Eobroscus bhutanensis Morvan, 1982
  - syn. E. uenoi Morita, 1995
- Eobroscus lutshniki (Roubal, 1928)
  - syn. E. amabilis (Uéno, 1953)
  - syn. E. chalybaeus (Kôno, 1936)
  - syn. E. richteri Kryzhanovskij, 1951
- Eobroscus masumotoi Morita, 1990

In 1990, Seiji Morita proposed the subgenus Orobroscus for the species E. bhutanensis and E. masumotoi; Morita added E. uenoi to this subgenus when it was described in 1995. In 2013, E. uenoi became synonymized with E. bhutanensis and Orobroscus with Eobroscus. The authors of this 2013 paper also said they were skeptical about the status of E. masumotoi, but tentatively kept it as a distinct species.
