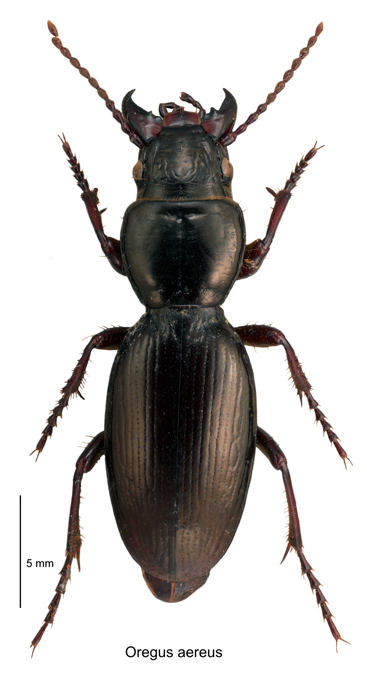
- Oregus aereus

Scientific classification
- Kingdom: Animalia
- Phylum: Arthropoda
- Clade: Pancrustacea
- Class: Insecta
- Order: Coleoptera
- Suborder: Adephaga
- Family: Carabidae
- Subfamily: Broscinae
- Tribe: Broscini
- Subtribe: Nothobroscina; Roig-Juňent, 2000

= Nothobroscina =

Subtribe of beetle

Nothobroscina is one of five subtribes within the ground beetle tribe Broscini. The subtribe consists of ten genera from the Gondwanan countries: Australia, New Caledonia, New Zealand and southern South America. All of these genera are endemic to their respective country, i.e., none of the genera are shared across any of the Gondwanan countries.

== Genera ==
- Chylnus
- Diglymma
- Eurylychnus
- Mecodema
- Monteremita
- Nothobroscus
- Oregus
- Orthoglymma
- Percolestus
- Percosoma
