= Acallistus =

Scientific classification
- Kingdom: Animalia
- Phylum: Arthropoda
- Class: Insecta
- Order: Coleoptera
- Suborder: Adephaga
- Family: Carabidae
- Subfamily: Broscinae
- Tribe: Broscini
- Subtribe: Creobiina
- Genus: Acallistus; Sharp, 1886

Genus of beetles

Acallistus is a genus of beetles in the family Carabidae, containing the following species:

- Acallistus cuprescens (Sloane, 1920)
- Acallistus longus (Sloane, 1920)
- Acallistus plebius (Sloane, 1920)
