= Nothocascellius =

Scientific classification
- Domain: Eukaryota
- Kingdom: Animalia
- Phylum: Arthropoda
- Class: Insecta
- Order: Coleoptera
- Suborder: Adephaga
- Family: Carabidae
- Subfamily: Broscinae
- Tribe: Broscini
- Subtribe: Creobiina
- Genus: Nothocascellius; Roig-Junent, 1995

Genus of beetles

Nothocascellius is a genus of beetles in the family Carabidae, containing the following species:

- Nothocascellius aeneoniger (Waterhouse, 1841)
- Nothocascellius hyadesii (Fairmaire, 1885)
