= Adotela =

Scientific classification
- Kingdom: Animalia
- Phylum: Arthropoda
- Class: Insecta
- Order: Coleoptera
- Suborder: Adephaga
- Family: Carabidae
- Subfamily: Broscinae
- Tribe: Broscini
- Subtribe: Creobiina
- Genus: Adotela; Castelnau, 1867

Genus of beetles

Adotela is a genus of beetles in the family Carabidae, containing the following species:

- Adotela apicalis (Sloane, 1893)
- Adotela atronitens Sloane, 1890
- Adotela australis Sloane, 1890
- Adotela bicolor (Castelnau, 1867)
- Adotela carbonaria (Castelnau, 1867)
- Adotela carenoides Putzeys, 1873
- Adotela concolor Castelnau, 1867
- Adotela esmeralda Castelnau, 1867
- Adotela frenchi Sloane, 1890
- Adotela grandis (Castelnau, 1867)
- Adotela howitti (Castelnau, 1867)
- Adotela laevigatta (Sloane, 1893)
- Adotela nigerrima MacLeay, 1873
- Adotela noctis (Sloane, 1893)
- Adotela striolata Putzeys, 1873
- Adotela violacea (Castelnau, 1867)
- Adotela viridis (MacLeay, 1871)
