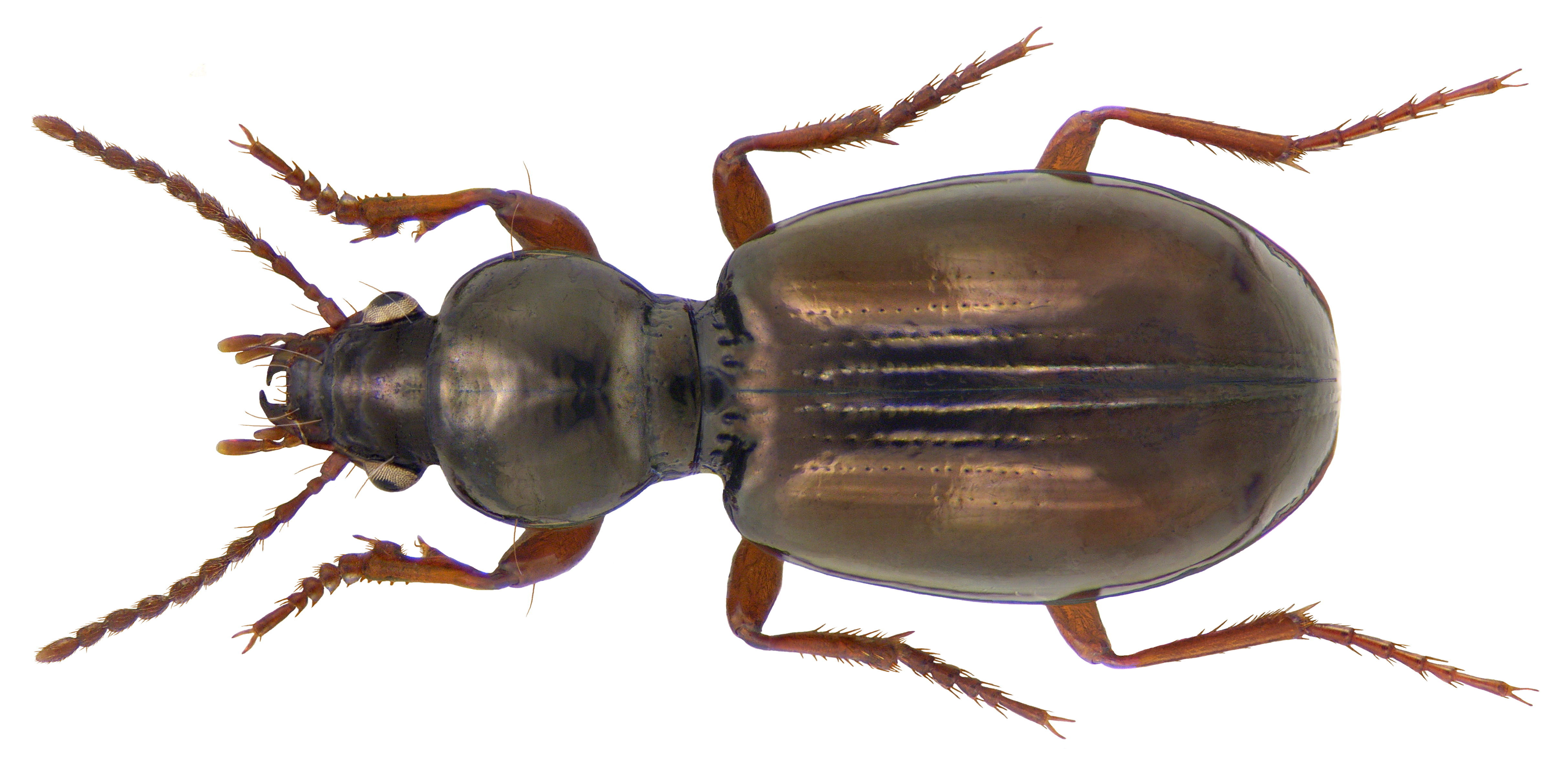

Scientific classification
- Domain: Eukaryota
- Kingdom: Animalia
- Phylum: Arthropoda
- Class: Insecta
- Order: Coleoptera
- Suborder: Adephaga
- Family: Carabidae
- Subfamily: Broscinae
- Tribe: Broscini
- Subtribe: Broscina
- Genus: Miscodera; Eschscholtz, 1830
- Species: M. arctica

Binomial name
- Miscodera arctica (Paykull, 1798)

= Miscodera =

Genus of beetles

Miscodera arctica is a species of beetles in the family Carabidae, the only species in the genus Miscodera. It is circumpolar in distribution, predominantly northern, with outliers in New Hampshire and Maine in the continental U.S. Its relationships have been long disputed. Here it is placed in subfamily Broscinae. While it certainly belongs to the more advanced ground beetles, it was alternatively placed in the subfamily Trechinae.
