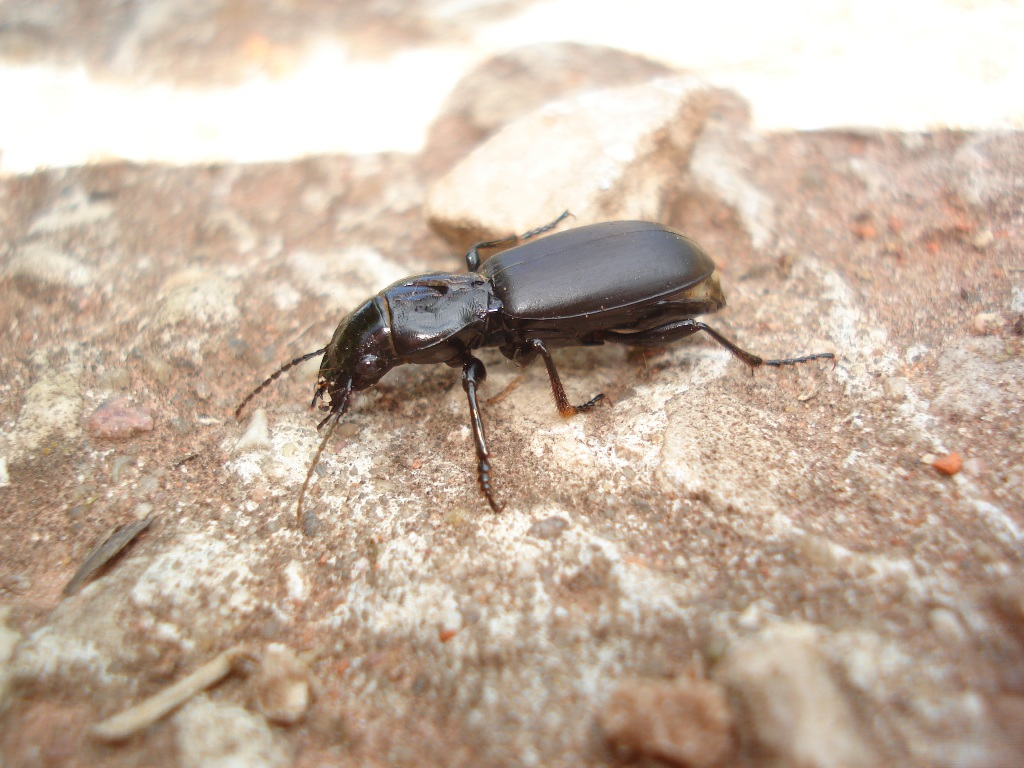
- Broscus cephalotes

Scientific classification
- Domain: Eukaryota
- Kingdom: Animalia
- Phylum: Arthropoda
- Class: Insecta
- Order: Coleoptera
- Suborder: Adephaga
- Family: Carabidae
- Subfamily: Broscinae
- Tribe: Broscini
- Subtribe: Broscina
- Genus: Broscus; Panzer, 1813

= Broscus =

Genus of beetles

Broscus is a genus of ground beetle native to the Palearctic, the Nearctic, the Near East and North Africa. It contains the following species:

- Broscus anatolicus Wrase & J.Schmidt, 2010
- Broscus angustulus Semenov, 1891
- Broscus asiaticus Ballion, 1871
- Broscus bipilifer Andrewes, 1927
- Broscus cephalotes (Linnaeus, 1758)
- Broscus costatus Morvan, 1980
- Broscus crassimargo Wollaston, 1865
- Broscus declivis Semenov, 1889
- Broscus eberti Jedlicka, 1965
- Broscus glaber (Brullé, 1836)
- Broscus insularis Piochard de la Brûlerie, 1868
- Broscus jaegeri J.Schmidt, 1996
- Broscus karelinii Zoubkoff, 1837
- Broscus kozlovi Kryzhanovskij, 1995
- Broscus laevigatus (Dejean, 1828)
- Broscus nobilis (Dejean, 1828)
- Broscus politus (Dejean, 1828)
- Broscus potanini Semenov, 1889
- Broscus przewalskii Semenov, 1889
- Broscus punctatus (Dejean, 1828)
- Broscus rutilans Wollaston, 1862
- Broscus semistriatus (Dejean, 1828)
- Broscus taurulus Andrewes, 1927
- Broscus uhagoni Bolivar y Pieltain, 1912
