= Broscodes =

Scientific classification
- Domain: Eukaryota
- Kingdom: Animalia
- Phylum: Arthropoda
- Class: Insecta
- Order: Coleoptera
- Suborder: Adephaga
- Family: Carabidae
- Subfamily: Broscinae
- Tribe: Broscini
- Subtribe: Axonyina
- Genus: Broscodes; Bolivar y Pieltain, 1914

Genus of beetles

Broscodes is a genus in the beetle family Carabidae. There are at least two described species in Broscodes.

== Species ==
These two species belong to the genus Broscodes:

- Broscodes championi (Andrewes, 1923) (Pakistan, Nepal, Bhutan, and India)
- Broscodes karumicus (Bolivar y Pieltain, 1914) (Iran)
