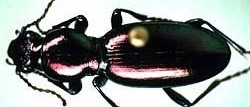

Scientific classification
- Kingdom: Animalia
- Phylum: Arthropoda
- Class: Insecta
- Order: Coleoptera
- Suborder: Adephaga
- Family: Carabidae
- Subfamily: Broscinae
- Tribe: Broscini
- Subtribe: Broscina
- Genus: Zacotus; LeConte, 1869
- Species: Z. matthewsii

Binomial name
- Zacotus matthewsii LeConte, 1869

= Zacotus =

Genus of beetles

Zacotus matthewsii is a species of beetle in the family Carabidae, the only species in the genus Zacotus.
