= Cerotalis =

Scientific classification
- Domain: Eukaryota
- Kingdom: Animalia
- Phylum: Arthropoda
- Class: Insecta
- Order: Coleoptera
- Suborder: Adephaga
- Family: Carabidae
- Subfamily: Broscinae
- Tribe: Broscini
- Subtribe: Creobiina
- Genus: Cerotalis; Laporte, 1867

Genus of beetles

Cerotalis is a genus in the beetle family Carabidae. There are about seven described species in Cerotalis, found in Australia.

== Species ==
These seven species belong to the genus Cerotalis:

- Cerotalis amabilis Sloane, 1890
- Cerotalis brachypleura Sloane, 1898
- Cerotalis longipes Sloane, 1898
- Cerotalis majuscula (Putzeys, 1868)
- Cerotalis semiviolacea Laporte, 1867
- Cerotalis substriata Laporte, 1867
- Cerotalis versicolor Laporte, 1867
