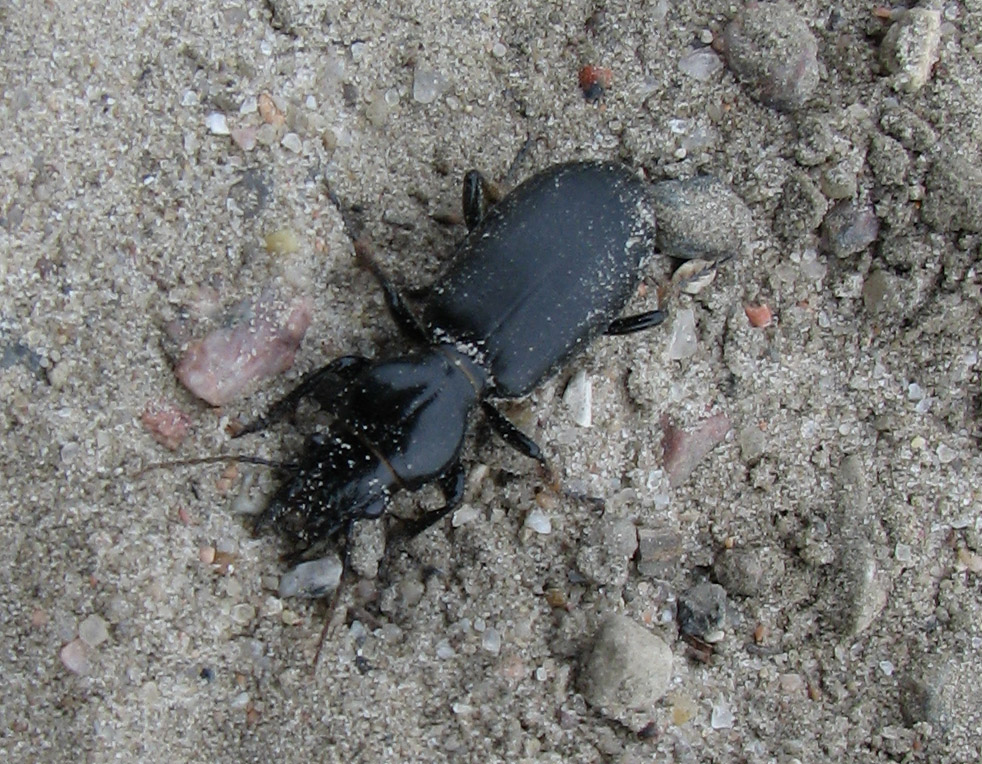
- Broscus cephalotes

Scientific classification
- Domain: Eukaryota
- Kingdom: Animalia
- Phylum: Arthropoda
- Class: Insecta
- Order: Coleoptera
- Suborder: Adephaga
- Family: Carabidae
- Subfamily: Broscinae
- Tribe: Broscini
- Subtribe: Broscina; Hope, 1838

= Broscina =

Subtribe of beetles

The subtribe Broscina is a group of beetles in the Broscini tribe of Carabidae (the ground beetles).

== Description ==
Broscina has eight accepted genera:

- Broscodera: 4 species (see note)
- Broscosoma: 34 species
- Broscus: 2 subgenera; 25 species
- Chaetobroscus: 2 subgenera; 4 species
- Craspedonotus: 3 species
- Eobroscus: 2 subgenera, 4 species
- Miscodera: 1 species
- Zacotus: 1 species

Note: Broscina also contains the Sinobrosculus genus which is in contention and considered doubtful with the three species alternatively being placed in Broscodera.
