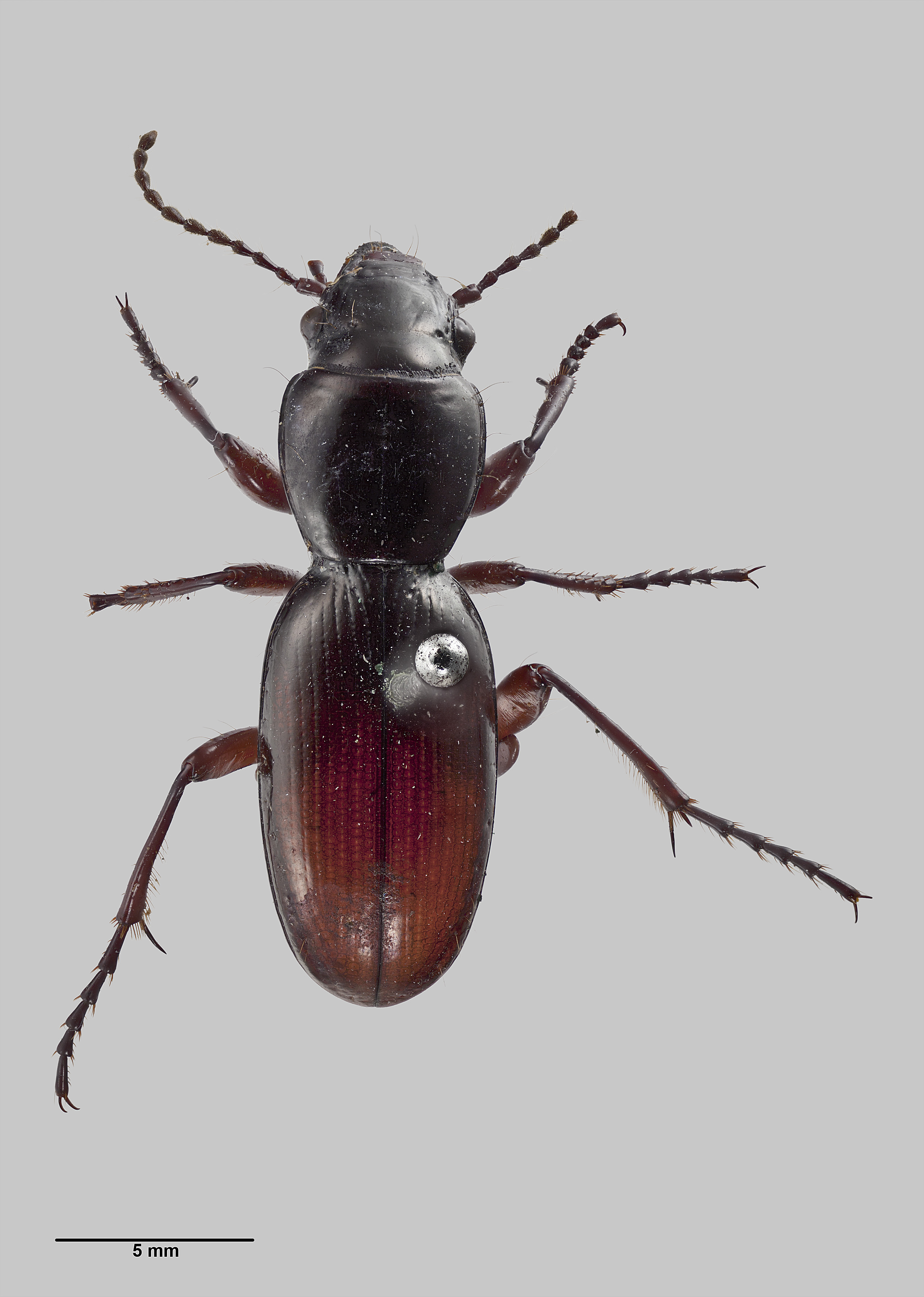
- Male holotype specimen of Oregus crypticus held at the Auckland War Memorial Museum.

Scientific classification
- Domain: Eukaryota
- Kingdom: Animalia
- Phylum: Arthropoda
- Class: Insecta
- Order: Coleoptera
- Suborder: Adephaga
- Family: Carabidae
- Subfamily: Broscinae
- Tribe: Broscini
- Subtribe: Nothobroscina
- Genus: Oregus; Putzeys, 1868

= Oregus =

Genus of beetles

Oregus is a genus of beetles in the family Carabidae that is endemic to New Zealand. A 2003 taxonomic revision of the group using both morphological and DNA characters concluded that it contained four species, and identified new species from Marlborough (Oregus spetentionalis) and North Canterbury (Oregus crypticus). The current species list is:

- Oregus aereus (White, 1846)
- Oregus crypticus Pawson, Emberson, Armstrong & Paterson, 2003
- Oregus inaequalis (Castelnau, 1867)
- Oregus septentrionalis Pawson, Emberson, Armstrong & Paterson, 2003
