= Roubal =

Roubal (feminine: Roubalová) is a Czech surname. Notable people with the surname include:

- Ivan Roubal (1951–2015), Czech serial killer
- Jan Roubal (1880–1971), Czech entomologist

== See also ==
- Raubal
