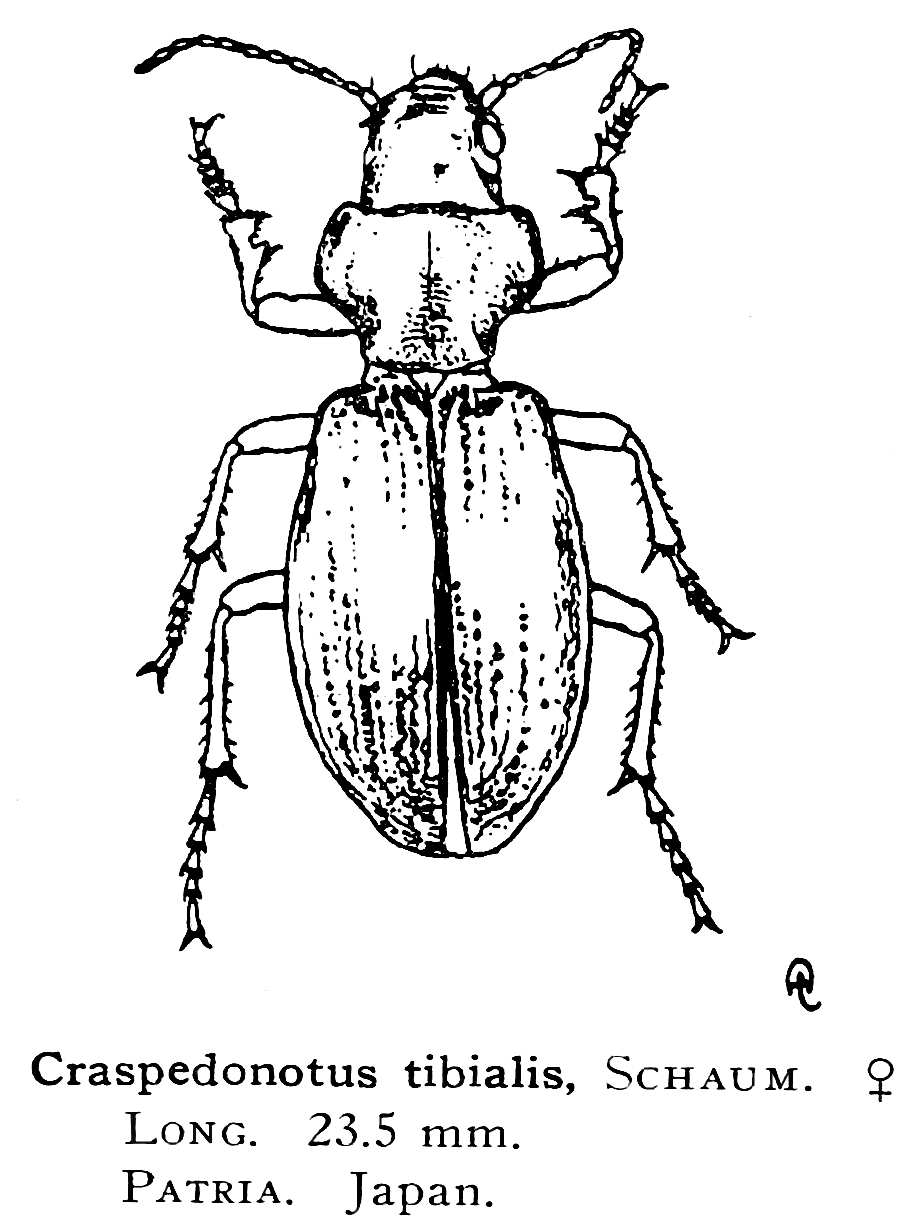
- Craspedonotus tibialis

Scientific classification
- Domain: Eukaryota
- Kingdom: Animalia
- Phylum: Arthropoda
- Class: Insecta
- Order: Coleoptera
- Suborder: Adephaga
- Family: Carabidae
- Subfamily: Broscinae
- Tribe: Broscini
- Subtribe: Broscina
- Genus: Craspedonotus; Schaum, 1863

= Craspedonotus =

Genus of beetles

Craspedonotus is a genus of beetles in the family Carabidae, containing the following species:

- Craspedonotus himalayanus Semenov, 1910
- Craspedonotus margellanicus Kraatz, 1884
- Craspedonotus tibialis Schaum, 1863
