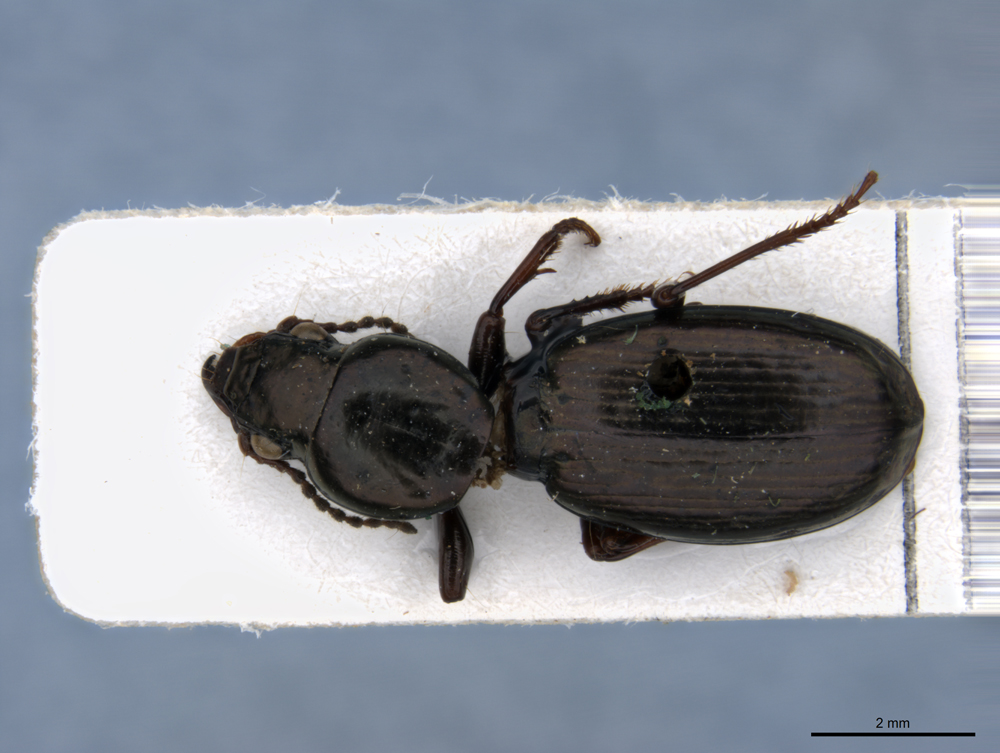

Scientific classification
- Kingdom: Animalia
- Phylum: Arthropoda
- Class: Insecta
- Order: Coleoptera
- Suborder: Adephaga
- Family: Carabidae
- Genus: Acallistus
- Species: A. cuprescens

Binomial name
- Acallistus cuprescens Sloane, 1920

Synonyms
- Promecoderus cuprescens Sloane 1920

= Acallistus cuprescens =

Species of beetle

Acallistus cuprescens is a species of ground beetle in the subfamily Broscinae. It was described by Thomas Gibson Sloane in 1920 and is an endemic species found in Tasmania, Australia.
