= Chaetobroscus =

Scientific classification
- Domain: Eukaryota
- Kingdom: Animalia
- Phylum: Arthropoda
- Class: Insecta
- Order: Coleoptera
- Suborder: Adephaga
- Family: Carabidae
- Subfamily: Broscinae
- Tribe: Broscini
- Subtribe: Broscina
- Genus: Chaetobroscus; Semenov, 1900

Genus of beetles

Chaetobroscus is a genus in the beetle family Carabidae. There are four described species in Chaetobroscus.

== Species ==
These four species belong to the genus Chaetobroscus:

- Chaetobroscus anomalus (Chaudoir, 1878) (Pakistan and India)
- Chaetobroscus bhutanensis Morvan, 1980 (Bhutan)
- Chaetobroscus kezukai Dostal, 1984 (India)
- Chaetobroscus meurguesae Morvan, 1984 (Pakistan)
