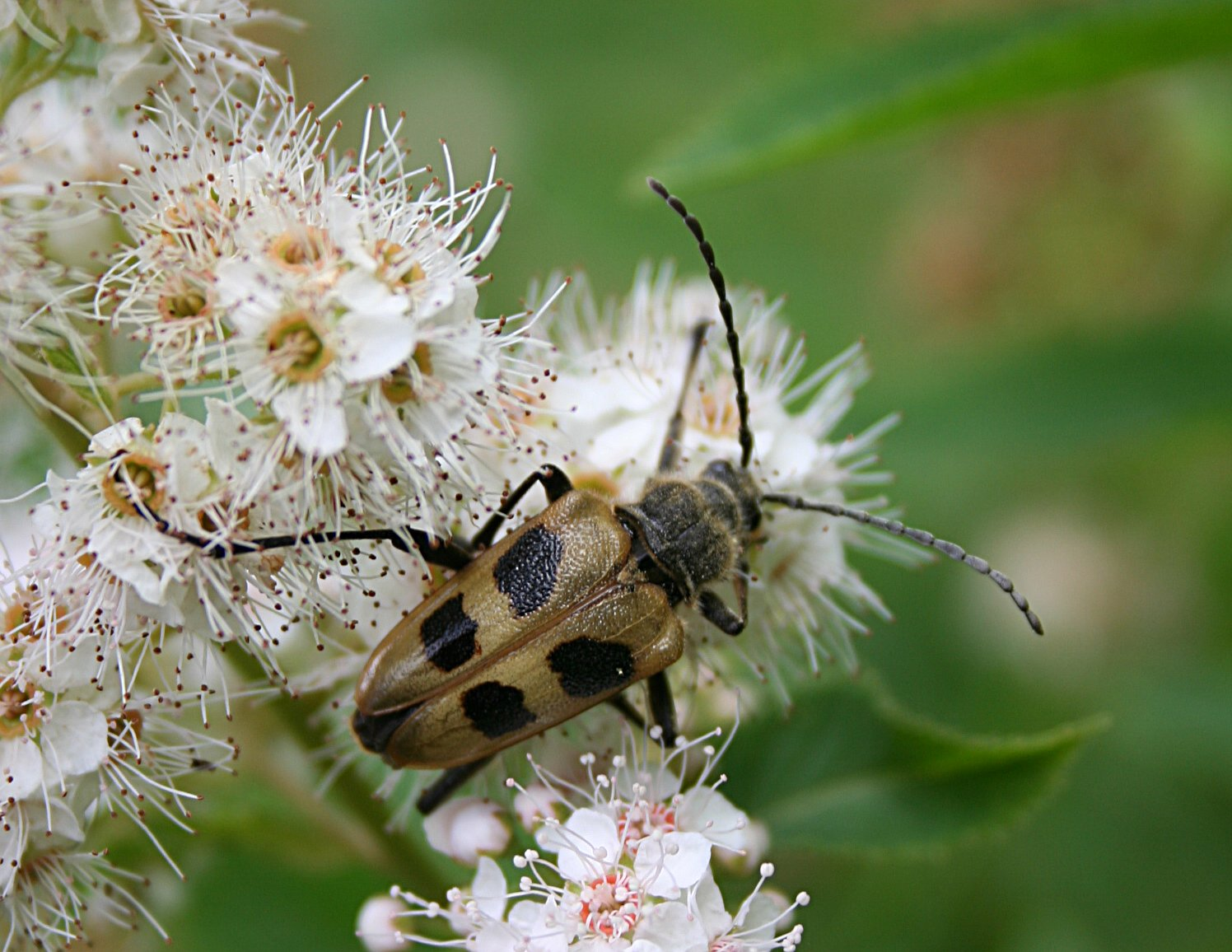
- Adult of Pachyta quadrimaculata

Scientific classification
- Kingdom: Animalia
- Phylum: Arthropoda
- Class: Insecta
- Order: Coleoptera
- Suborder: Polyphaga
- Infraorder: Cucujiformia
- Family: Cerambycidae
- Genus: Pachyta
- Species: P. quadrimaculata

Binomial name
- Pachyta quadrimaculata (Linnaeus, 1758)

Synonyms
- Leptura octomaculata Fabricius, 1792 nec Schaller, 1783; Leptura quadrimaculata Linnaeus, 1758; Leptura timida Scopoli, 1763; Pachyta quadrimaculata var. reducta Villiers, 1978; Stenocorus major punctatus Voet, 1806

= Pachyta quadrimaculata =

Species of beetle

Pachyta quadrimaculata is a species of the Lepturinae subfamily in the longhorn beetle family.

== Subtaxa ==
There are five varieties in the species:

- Pachyta quadrimaculata var. basinotata Roubal, 1937
- Pachyta quadrimaculata var. bimaculata Schönherr, 1817
- Pachyta quadrimaculata var. hubenthali Jänner, 1918–1919
- Pachyta quadrimaculata var. mulsanti Pic, 1945
- Pachyta quadrimaculata var. sexmaculata Heyrovsky, 1934

== Distribution ==
This beetle is present in Austria, Bulgaria, Croatia, Czech Republic, Estonia, Finland, France, Germany, Hungary, Italy, Mongolia, Poland, Romania, Serbia, Slovakia, Slovenia, Spain, Switzerland, Central and Eastern European Russia, They are absent in the British Isles and the Netherlands. up to Siberia. The eastern boundary of the distribution area runs along the Amur River.

== Habitat ==
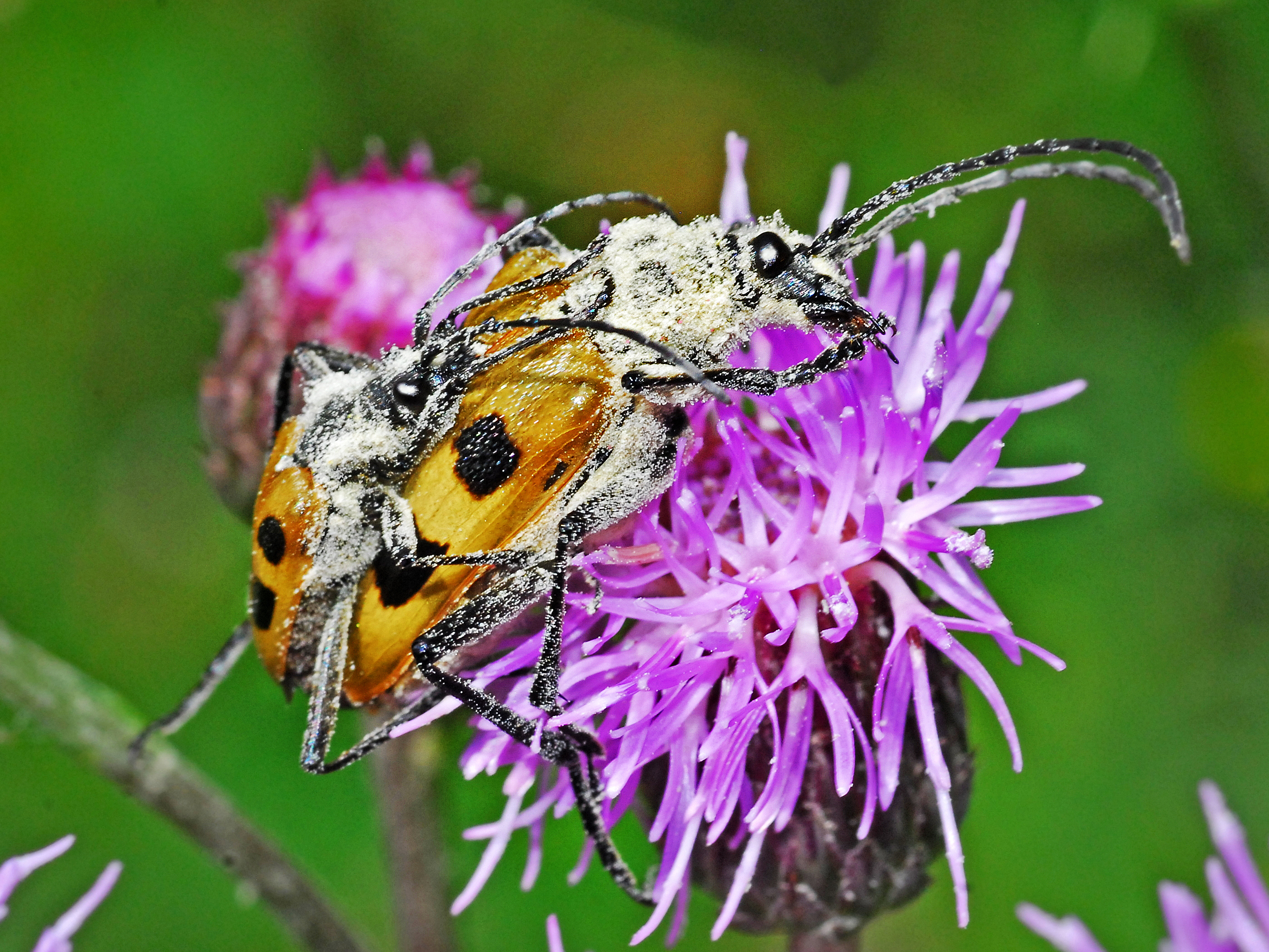
Mating couple, covered with pollen

This species can be found in the coniferous forests and on forest paths of Europe.

== Description ==
Adult beetles of Pachyta quadrimaculata can reach a body length of about 11 to 22 mm, but females have a more compact body than males. These beetles have a black body and show straw-yellow elytra with four large black spots, two spots on each elyton. Said two spot can occasionally be fused with one another, and there are also individuals who only wear one patch per wing. The head and the pronotum are long, with protruding yellow hairs. Elytra and the pronotum are rather dotted.

== Biology ==
Adults flight period, when the fully formed beetles can be found, extends from mid-June until the beginning of August. The life cycle for imago reaches three years. These beetles usually visit flowers, especially flowering shrubs and Apiaceae flowers. Larvae develop in coniferous wood. They live in superficial dead pine roots and possibly also in dead spruce roots. They mainly feed on Scots Pine (Pinus sylvestris) and on Norway Spruce (Picea abies).

== Bibliography ==
- The national key to Sweden's flora and fauna. Beetles: Coleoptera: Cerambycidae. 2007. ArtDatabanken, SLU, Uppsala, ISBN 978-91-88506-62-7 (in Swedish)
