= Orthoglymma =

Scientific classification
- Kingdom: Animalia
- Phylum: Arthropoda
- Class: Insecta
- Order: Coleoptera
- Suborder: Adephaga
- Family: Carabidae
- Subfamily: Broscinae
- Tribe: Broscini
- Subtribe: Nothobroscina
- Genus: Orthoglymma; Liebherr, Marris, Emberson, Syret & Roig–Junent, 2011
- Species: O. wangapeka

Binomial name
- Orthoglymma wangapeka Liebherr, Marris, Emberson, Syret & Roig–Junent, 2011

Genus of beetles

Orthoglymma is a genus of endemic New Zealand ground beetle in the Gondwanan subtribe Nothobroscina. There is a single species, Orthoglymma wangapeka.
