= Broscodera =

Scientific classification
- Domain: Eukaryota
- Kingdom: Animalia
- Phylum: Arthropoda
- Class: Insecta
- Order: Coleoptera
- Suborder: Adephaga
- Family: Carabidae
- Subfamily: Broscinae
- Tribe: Broscini
- Subtribe: Broscina
- Genus: Broscodera; Lindroth, 1961

Subgenera
- Broscodera Lindroth, 1961; Sinobrosculus Deuve, 1990

Genus of beetles

Broscodera is a genus in the beetle family Carabidae. There are at least four described species in Broscodera.

== Species ==
These four species belong to the genus Broscodera:

- Broscodera dreuxi (Deuve, 1990) (China)
- Broscodera holzschuhi (Wrase, 1995) (Nepal)
- Broscodera insignis (Mannerheim, 1852) (Nepal, United States, Canada, and Alaska)
- Broscodera morvani Deuve, 2004 (China)
