= Creobiina =

Scientific classification
- Kingdom: Animalia
- Phylum: Arthropoda
- Class: Insecta
- Order: Coleoptera
- Suborder: Adephaga
- Family: Carabidae
- Subfamily: Broscinae
- Tribe: Broscini
- Subtribe: Creobiina; Jeannel, 1941

Subtribe of beetles

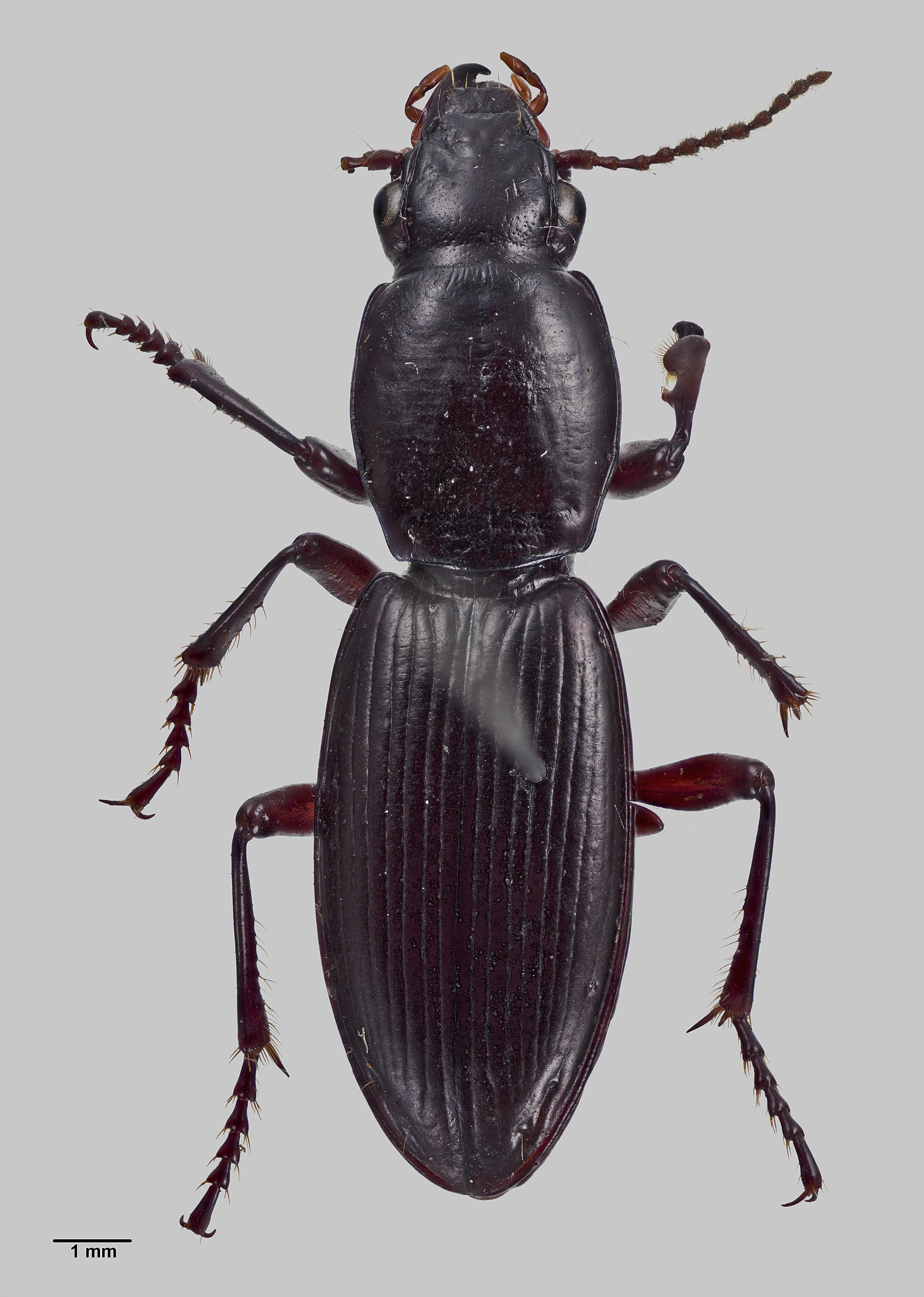
Bountya insularis

The subtribe Creobiina is a group of beetles in the Broscini tribe of Carabidae (the ground beetles) and is found in Australia, New Zealand and South America.

== Description ==
Creobiina has 11 genera:

- Acallistus: 4 species
- Adotela: 17 species
- Anheterus: 3 species
- Bountya: 1 species
- Brithysternum: 3 species
- Cascellius: 2 species
- Cerotalis: 7 species
- Creobius: 1 species
- Gnathoxys: 17 species
- Nothocascellius: 2 species
- Promecoderus: 40 species
