= Gnathoxys =

Scientific classification
- Kingdom: Animalia
- Phylum: Arthropoda
- Class: Insecta
- Order: Coleoptera
- Suborder: Adephaga
- Family: Carabidae
- Subfamily: Broscinae
- Tribe: Broscini
- Subtribe: Creobiina
- Genus: Gnathoxys; Westwood, 1839

Genus of beetles

Gnathoxys is a genus of beetles in the family Carabidae, containing the following species:

- Gnathoxys barbatus MacLeay, 1864
- Gnathoxys cicatricosus Reiche, 1842
- Gnathoxys crassipes Sloane, 1898
- Gnathoxys foveatus MacLeay, 1863
- Gnathoxys granularis Westwood, 1842
- Gnathoxys humeralis MacLeay, 1864
- Gnathoxys insignitus MacLeay, 1864
- Gnathoxys irregularis Westwood, 1842
- Gnathoxys macleayi Putzeys, 1868
- Gnathoxys murrumbidgensis MacLeay, 1865
- Gnathoxys obscurus Reiche, 1842
- Gnathoxys pannuceus Guthrie, 2007
- Gnathoxys punctipennis MacLeay, 1873
- Gnathoxys submetallicus MacLeay, 1864
- Gnathoxys sulcicollis Sloane, 1910
- Gnathoxys tesselatus MacLeay, 1864
- Gnathoxys westwoodi Putzeys, 1868
