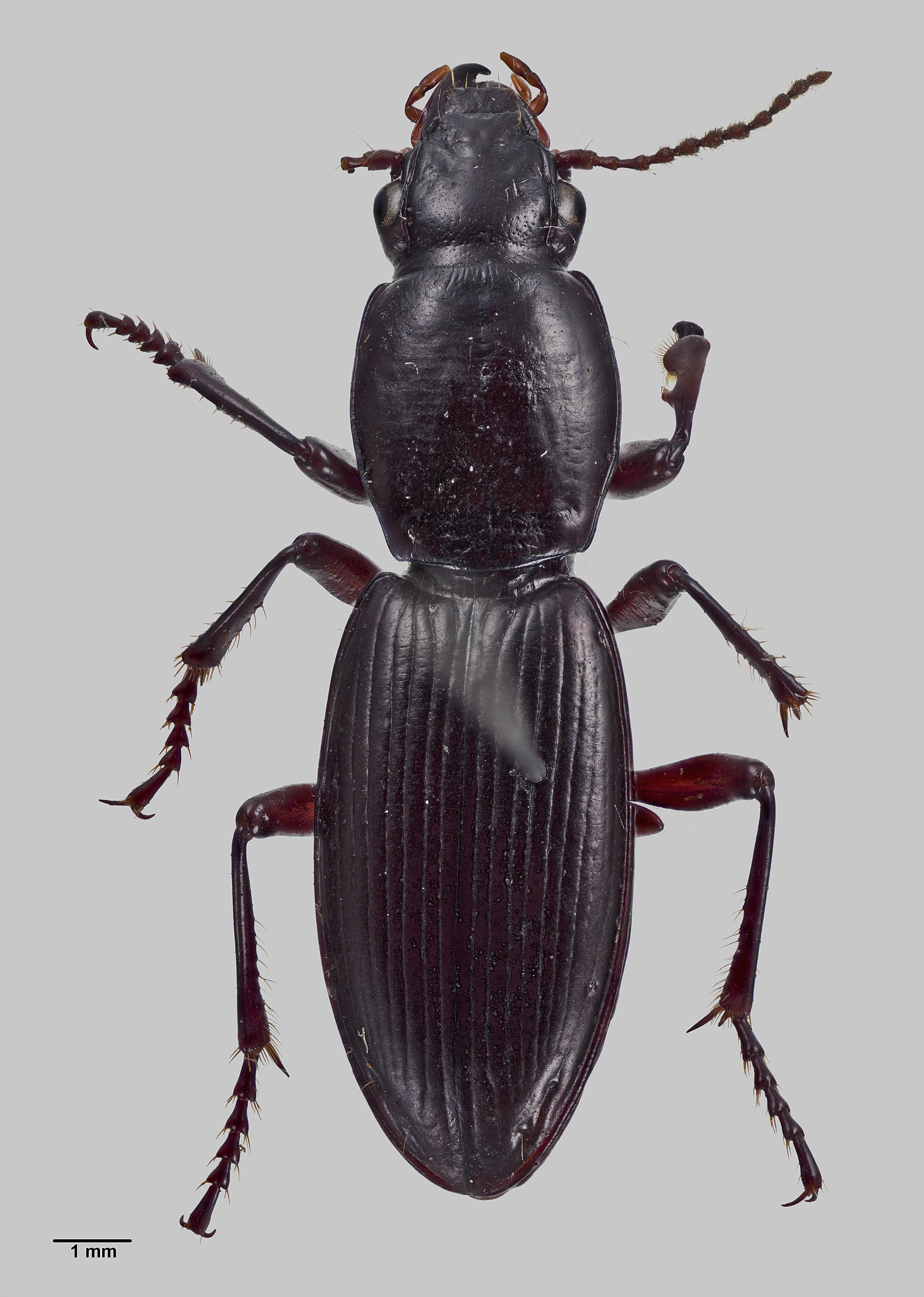
- Male holotype specimen held at the Auckland War Memorial Museum.

Conservation status
- Naturally Uncommon (NZ TCS)

Scientific classification
- Kingdom: Animalia
- Phylum: Arthropoda
- Class: Insecta
- Order: Coleoptera
- Suborder: Adephaga
- Family: Carabidae
- Subfamily: Broscinae
- Tribe: Broscini
- Subtribe: Creobiina
- Genus: Bountya; Townsend, 1971
- Species: B. insularis

Binomial name
- Bountya insularis Townsend, 1971

= Bountya =

Genus of beetles

Bountya insularis is a species of beetle in the family Carabidae, the only species in the genus Bountya. Both the genus and species was first described by J. I. Townsend in 1971 from specimens collected by E. G. Turbott on Bounty Island on 11 November 1950. The holotype specimen is in the entomology collection of the Auckland War Memorial Museum.
