= Brithysternum =

Scientific classification
- Kingdom: Animalia
- Phylum: Arthropoda
- Class: Insecta
- Order: Coleoptera
- Suborder: Adephaga
- Family: Carabidae
- Subfamily: Broscinae
- Tribe: Broscini
- Subtribe: Creobiina
- Genus: Brithysternum; Macleay, 1873

Synonyms
- Brithysternus

Genus of beetles

Brithysternum is a genus of ground beetle in the subfamily Broscinae. The genus was described by William John Macleay in 1873 with the genus being found in Australia and containing the following species:

- Brithysternum calcaratum Macleay, 1873
- Brithysternum macleayi Sloane, 1910
- Brithysternum nodosum Sloane, 1910
