= Anheterus =

Scientific classification
- Domain: Eukaryota
- Kingdom: Animalia
- Phylum: Arthropoda
- Class: Insecta
- Order: Coleoptera
- Suborder: Adephaga
- Family: Carabidae
- Subfamily: Broscinae
- Tribe: Broscini
- Subtribe: Creobiina
- Genus: Anheterus; Putzeys, 1868

Genus of beetles

Anheterus is a genus of ground beetle in the subfamily Broscinae. The genus was described by Jules Putzeys in 1868 with the genus being found in Australia and containing the following species:

- Anheterus ambiguus Sloane, 1892
- Anheterus distinctus Sloane, 1890
- Anheterus gracilis Sloane, 1848
