= Adotela frenchi =

Scientific classification
- Kingdom: Animalia
- Phylum: Arthropoda
- Class: Insecta
- Order: Coleoptera
- Suborder: Adephaga
- Family: Carabidae
- Genus: Adotela
- Species: A. frenchi

Binomial name
- Adotela frenchi Sloane, 1890

Species of beetle

Adotela frenchi is a species of ground beetle in the subfamily Broscinae in the genus Adotela. The species was described in 1890.
