= Promecoderus =

Scientific classification
- Kingdom: Animalia
- Phylum: Arthropoda
- Class: Insecta
- Order: Coleoptera
- Suborder: Adephaga
- Family: Carabidae
- Subfamily: Broscinae
- Tribe: Broscini
- Subtribe: Creobiina
- Genus: Promecoderus; Dejean, 1829

Synonyms
- Anheretus; Cnemacanthus G. R. Gray, 1832

Genus of beetles

Promecoderus is a genus of ground beetle in the subfamily Broscinae. The genus was described by Pierre François Marie Auguste Dejean in 1829 with the genus being found in Australia and is divided into six groups with several subgroups:

1. albaniensis group (sensu Sloane, 1890; Roig-Juñent, 2000)

- Promecoderus albaniensis Laporte de Castelnau, 1867
- Promecoderus pacificus Sloane, 1890
- Promecoderus pygmaeus Laporte de Castelnau, 1867

2. brunnicornis group (sensu Sloane, 1890; Roig-Juñent, 2000)

- Promecoderus brunnicornis Dejean, 1829

3. clivinoides group (sensu Sloane, 1890, 1898; Roig-Juñent, 2000)

- Promecoderus castelnaui Sloane, 1892
- Promecoderus clivinoides Guérin-Ménéville, 1841
- Promecoderus comes Sloane, 1890
- Promecoderus dyschirioides Guérin-Ménéville, 1841
- Promecoderus hunteriensis Macleay, 1873
- Promecoderus intermedius Sloane, 1898
- Promecoderus interruptus Macleay, 1873
- Promecoderus lei Sloane, 1898
- Promecoderus maritimus Laporte de Castelnau, 1867
- Promecoderus nigellus Sloane, 1890
- Promecoderus nigricornis Laporte de Castelnau, 1867
- Promecoderus ovipennis Sloane, 1898
- Promecoderus scauroides Laporte de Castelnau, 1867
- Promecoderus sloanei Blackburn, 1901
- Promecoderus striatopunctatus Laporte de Castelnau, 1867
- Promecoderus wilcoxii Laporte de Castelnau, 1867

4. concolor group (sensu Sloane, 1890; Roig-Juñent, 2000)

- Promecoderus blackburni Sloane, 1890
- Promecoderus concolor Germar, 1848
- Promecoderus insignis Sloane, 1890

5. gibbosus-subdepressus-inornatus group (Sensu Sloane, 1890; Roig-Juñent, 2000)
5a. gibbosus subgroup

- Promecoderus basii Laporte de Castelnau, 1867
- Promecoderus gibbosus G. R. Gray, 1832
- Promecoderus mastersii Macleay, 1873

5b. inornatus subgroup

- Promecoderus dorsalis Macleay, 1873
- Promecoderus inornatus Macleay, 1873
- Promecoderus neglectus Laporte de Castelnau, 1867
- Promecoderus olivaceus Macleay, 1873
- Promecoderus semistriatus Laporte de Castelnau, 1867

5c. subdepressus subgroup

- Promecoderus curvipes Sloane, 1920
- Promecoderus elegans Laporte de Castelnau, 1867
- Promecoderus modestus Laporte de Castelnau, 1867
- Promecoderus clivinoides Guérin-Ménéville, 1841

6. unassociated species

- Promecoderus anguliceps Sloane, 1898
- Promecoderus cordicollis Sloane, 1908
- Promecoderus lottini Brullé, 1834
- Promecoderus riverinae Macleay, 1873
- Promecoderus viridianeus Sloane, 1915
