= Chylnus =

Scientific classification
- Kingdom: Animalia
- Phylum: Arthropoda
- Clade: Pancrustacea
- Class: Insecta
- Order: Coleoptera
- Suborder: Adephaga
- Family: Carabidae
- Subfamily: Broscinae
- Tribe: Broscini
- Subtribe: Nothobroscina
- Genus: Chylnus; Sloane, 1920

Genus of beetles

Chylnus is a genus of beetles in the family Carabidae, containing the following species:

- Chylnus ater (Putzeys, 1868)
- Chylnus concolor (Sloane, 1892)
- Chylnus montanus (Casletnau, 1867)
- Chylnus substriatus (Moore, 1960)
