= Axonyina =

Scientific classification
- Domain: Eukaryota
- Kingdom: Animalia
- Phylum: Arthropoda
- Class: Insecta
- Order: Coleoptera
- Suborder: Adephaga
- Family: Carabidae
- Subfamily: Broscinae
- Tribe: Broscini
- Subtribe: Axonyina; Roig-Juñent, 2000

Subtribe of beetles

The subtribe Axonyina is a group of beetles in the Broscini tribe of Carabidae (the ground beetles).

== Description ==
Axonyina has three genera:

- Axonya: 3 species.
- Broscodes: 1 species.
- Rawlinsius: 1 species.
