= Adotela concolor =

Scientific classification
- Kingdom: Animalia
- Phylum: Arthropoda
- Class: Insecta
- Order: Coleoptera
- Suborder: Adephaga
- Family: Carabidae
- Genus: Adotela
- Species: A. concolor

Binomial name
- Adotela concolor Castelnau, 1867

Species of beetle

Adotela concolor is a species of Broscinae in the genus Adotela. A. concolor is an endemic species found in Western Australia, Australia.

== Distribution ==
Adotela concolor is found in the south western coastal areas of Western Australia and has been collected from the Swan River basin.
