= Cascellius =

Scientific classification
- Kingdom: Animalia
- Phylum: Arthropoda
- Class: Insecta
- Order: Coleoptera
- Suborder: Adephaga
- Family: Carabidae
- Subfamily: Broscinae
- Tribe: Broscini
- Subtribe: Creobiina
- Genus: Cascellius; Curtis, 1839

Genus of beetles

Cascellius is a genus of beetles in the family Carabidae, containing the following species:

- Cascellius gravesii Curtis, 1839
- Cascellius septentrionalis Roig-Junent, 1995
