= Nothobroscus =

Scientific classification
- Domain: Eukaryota
- Kingdom: Animalia
- Phylum: Arthropoda
- Class: Insecta
- Order: Coleoptera
- Suborder: Adephaga
- Family: Carabidae
- Subfamily: Broscinae
- Tribe: Broscini
- Subtribe: Nothobroscina
- Genus: Nothobroscus; Roig-Junent & Ball, 1995
- Species: N. chilensis

Binomial name
- Nothobroscus chilensis Roig-Junent & Ball, 1995

Genus of beetles

Nothobroscus chilensis is a species of beetle in the family Carabidae, the only species in the genus Nothobroscus.
