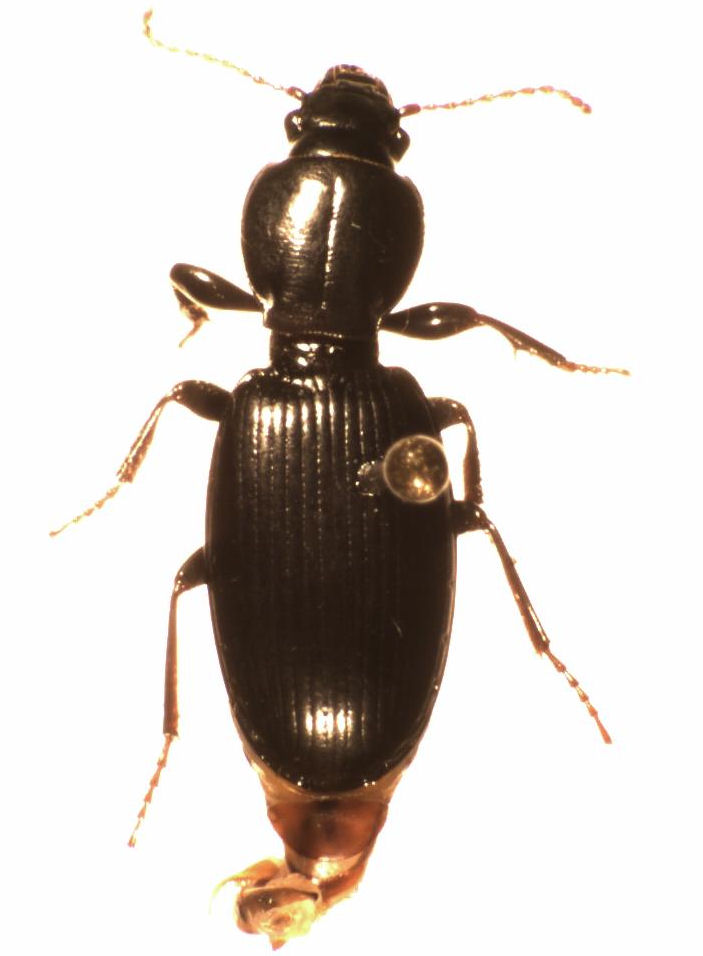
- Diglymma clivinoides

Scientific classification
- Kingdom: Animalia
- Phylum: Arthropoda
- Class: Insecta
- Order: Coleoptera
- Suborder: Adephaga
- Family: Carabidae
- Subfamily: Broscinae
- Tribe: Broscini
- Subtribe: Nothobroscina
- Genus: Diglymma; Sharp, 1886

= Diglymma =

Genus of beetles

Diglymma is a genus in the beetle family Carabidae. There are about five described species in Diglymma, found in New Zealand.

== Species ==
These five species belong to the genus Diglymma:

- Diglymma castigatum Broun, 1909
- Diglymma clivinoides (Laporte, 1867)
- Diglymma marginale Broun, 1914
- Diglymma obtusum (Broun, 1886)
- Diglymma seclusum (Johns, 2007)
