= Rawlinsius =

Scientific classification
- Domain: Eukaryota
- Kingdom: Animalia
- Phylum: Arthropoda
- Class: Insecta
- Order: Coleoptera
- Suborder: Adephaga
- Family: Carabidae
- Subfamily: Broscinae
- Tribe: Broscini
- Subtribe: Axonyina
- Genus: Rawlinsius; Davidson & Ball, 1998
- Species: R. papillatus

Binomial name
- Rawlinsius papillatus Davidson & Ball, 1998

Genus of beetles

Rawlinsius papillatus is a species of beetle in the family Carabidae, the only species in the genus Rawlinsius.
