= Creobius =

Scientific classification
- Domain: Eukaryota
- Kingdom: Animalia
- Phylum: Arthropoda
- Class: Insecta
- Order: Coleoptera
- Suborder: Adephaga
- Family: Carabidae
- Subfamily: Broscinae
- Tribe: Broscini
- Subtribe: Creobiina
- Genus: Creobius; Guerin-Meneville, 1838
- Species: C. eudouxii

Binomial name
- Creobius eudouxii (Guenen-Meneville, 1838)

Genus of beetles

Creobius eudouxii is a species of beetle in the family Carabidae, the only species in the genus Creobius.
