= Rolex (disambiguation) =

Rolex is a Swiss luxury watch manufacturer based in Geneva, Switzerland.

Rolex may also refer to:

- Rolex (food), a popular food item in Uganda, combining an egg omelette and vegetables wrapped in a chapati
- Rolex Tower, a 59-floor tower in Dubai, United Arab Emirates

== Films ==
- Rolex, a fictional Indian film character portrayed by Suriya in the Lokesh Cinematic Universe

== Music ==
- "Rolex" (song), a 2017 single by American duo Ayo & Teo
- "Rolex", a 2019 song by German rapper Capital Bra on the album CB6
- "Rolex Sweep", a 2008 song by British grime artist Skepta
- "Wearing My Rolex", a 2008 single from British grime artist Wiley
- Comunisti col Rolex, a 2017 collaborative album by Italian hip hop artists J-Ax and Fedez

== Sports ==
=== Golf ===
- Rolex Golf Classic, a golf tournament held in Japan from 1968 to 1973
- Rolex Masters, a golf tournament held in Singapore from 1973 to 1998
- Rolex Trophy, a golf tournament on the Challenge Tour in Geneva, Switzerland

=== Tennis ===
- Paris Masters, a tennis tournament sponsored as the Rolex Paris Masters since 2017
- Rolex Monte-Carlo Masters, an annual tennis tournament in Roquebrune-Cap-Martin, France
- Shanghai Masters (tennis), a tennis tournament sponsored as the Shanghai Rolex Masters

== Organisms and species ==
- Broscosoma rolex, species of insect from Broscosoma
- Deltocolpodes rolex, species of insect from Deltocolpodes
- Leistus rolex, species of insect from Leistus
- Pheropsophus rolex, species of insect from Pheropsophus
- Pterostichus rolex, species of insect from Pterostichus
