= Pachyta erebia =

Scientific classification
- Kingdom: Animalia
- Phylum: Arthropoda
- Clade: Pancrustacea
- Class: Insecta
- Order: Coleoptera
- Suborder: Polyphaga
- Infraorder: Cucujiformia
- Family: Cerambycidae
- Genus: Pachyta
- Species: P. erebia

Binomial name
- Pachyta erebia Bates, 1884

Synonyms
- Pachyta uenoi Makihara, 1995

Species of beetle

Pachyta erebia is the species of the Lepturinae subfamily in long-horned beetle family. The beetle is distributed in Japan.

== Subtaxons ==
There are two variants of subspecies:

- Pachyta erebia var. kusamai Hayashi, 1955
- Pachyta erebia var. tamanukii Hayashi & Iga, 1945
