= Adotela bicolor =

Scientific classification
- Domain: Eukaryota
- Kingdom: Animalia
- Phylum: Arthropoda
- Class: Insecta
- Order: Coleoptera
- Suborder: Adephaga
- Family: Carabidae
- Genus: Adotela
- Species: A. bicolor

Binomial name
- Adotela bicolor (Castelnau, 1867)

Species of beetle

Adotela bicolor is a species of beetle in the genus Adotela. It was first described by Francis de Laporte de Castelnau in 1867. Adotela bicolor is an endemic species found in Australia.
