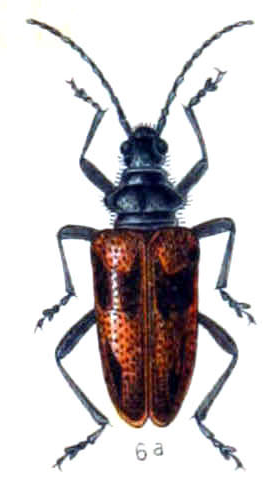

Scientific classification
- Kingdom: Animalia
- Phylum: Arthropoda
- Class: Insecta
- Order: Coleoptera
- Suborder: Polyphaga
- Infraorder: Cucujiformia
- Family: Cerambycidae
- Genus: Pachyta
- Species: P. lamed

Binomial name
- Pachyta lamed (Linnaeus, 1758)

Synonyms
- Cerambyx lamed Linnaeus, 1758; Leptura pedella De Geer, 1775; Leptura spadicea Paykull, 1800

= Pachyta lamed =

Species of beetle

Pachyta lamed is a bettle species of the Lepturinae subfamily in long-horned beetle family. This beetle is distributed in Austria, Belarus, Bulgaria, Czech Republic, Denmark, Estonia, Finland, France, Germany, Hungary, Italy, Japan, Latvia, Lithuania, Moldova, Mongolia, Norway, Poland, Romania, Russia, Slovakia, Slovenia, Sweden, Switzerland, Ukraine, and in United States, and Canada. Adult beetle feeds on Norway spruce.

The larvae reside within the roots or stumps of dead or decaying coniferous trees, particularly spruce (Picea spp.) and fir (Abies spp.). During the larval stage, which can span many years, the beetles dig into the wood and feed on the decomposing tissues.

== Subtaxons ==
There are two subspecies in species:

- Pachyta lamed lamed (Linnaeus, 1758) - Eurasian subspecies
- Pachyta lamed liturata Kirby, 1837 - North America subspecies
