= Raubal =

Raubal is a German surname. Notable people with the surname include:

- Angela Raubal, née Hitler (1883–1949), elder half-sister of Adolf Hitler
- Anton Raubal (1968–2024), German icehockey player
- Geli Raubal (1908–1931), Adolf Hitler's half niece
- Leo Rudolf Raubal Jr. (1906–1977), teacher, soldier and manager

== See also ==
- Roubal
- Rauball
