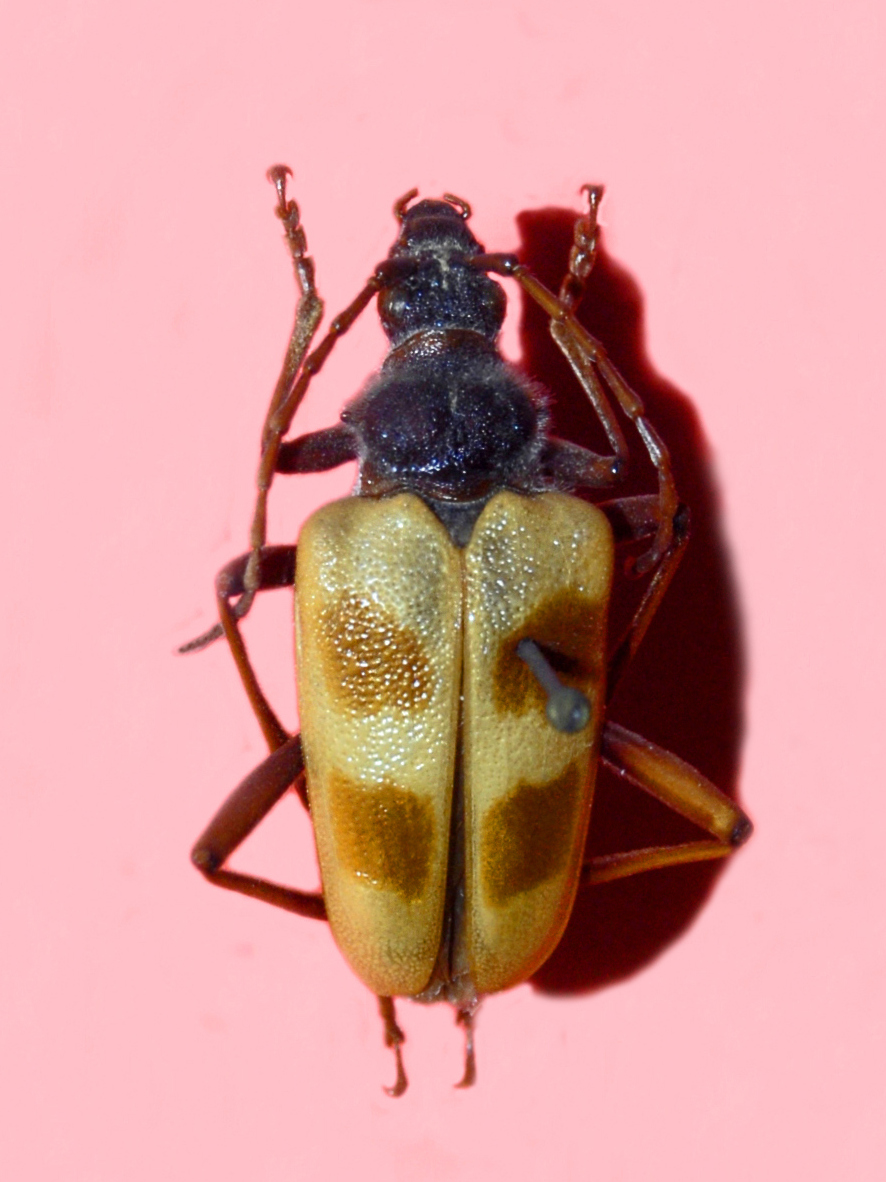
- Pachyta quadrimaculata. Mounted specimen

Scientific classification
- Domain: Eukaryota
- Kingdom: Animalia
- Phylum: Arthropoda
- Class: Insecta
- Order: Coleoptera
- Suborder: Polyphaga
- Infraorder: Cucujiformia
- Family: Cerambycidae
- Subfamily: Lepturinae
- Genus: Pachyta

Synonyms
- Argaleus LeConte, 1850; Neopachyta Bedel, 1906; Acmaeops Thomson, 1866; Anthophylax Blessig, 1873

= Pachyta =

Genus of beetles

Pachyta is a genus of beetles in the family Cerambycidae.

== Subgenera and species ==
- Fairmairia Podaný, 1964
  - Pachyta oxyoma Fairmaire, 1889
- Pachyta Dejean, 1821
  - Pachyta armata LeConte, 1873
  - Pachyta bicuneata Motschulsky, 1860
  - Pachyta degener Semenov & Plavilstshikov, 1936
  - Pachyta erebia Bates, 1884
  - Pachyta felix Holzschuh, 2007
  - Pachyta gorodinskii Rapuzzi, 2013
  - Pachyta lamed (Linnaeus, 1758)
  - Pachyta mediofasciata Pic, 1936
  - Pachyta perlata Holzschuh, 1991
  - Pachyta quadrimaculata (Linnaeus, 1758)
