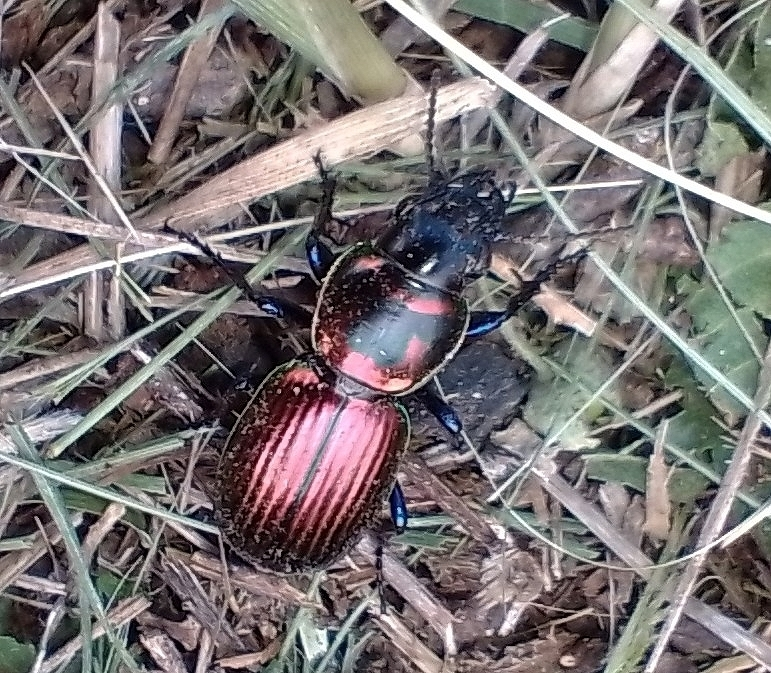
- Baripus, Argentina

Scientific classification
- Kingdom: Animalia
- Phylum: Arthropoda
- Class: Insecta
- Order: Coleoptera
- Suborder: Adephaga
- Family: Carabidae
- Subfamily: Broscinae
- Tribe: Broscini
- Subtribe: Baripodina
- Genus: Baripus; Dejean, 1828

Subgenera
- Barypus Dejean, 1828; Arathymus Guérin-Méneville, 1841; Cardiophthalmus Curtis, 1839

= Baripus =

Genus of beetles

Baripus is a genus of in the beetle family Carabidae. There are more than 20 described species in Baripus, found in South America.

== Species ==
These 27 species belong to the genus Baripus:

- Baripus aequicostis Chaudoir, 1876 (Uruguay)
- Baripus bonvouloirii Chaudoir, 1861 (Chile)
- Baripus calchaquensis Roig-Juñent, 1993 (Argentina)
- Baripus chubutensis Roig-Juñent, 1992 (Argentina)
- Baripus clivinoides (Curtis, 1839) (Chile and Argentina)
- Baripus comechingonensis Roig-Juñent, 1993 (Argentina)
- Baripus dentipenis Roig-Juñent, 1992 (Argentina)
- Baripus deplanatus Roig-Juñent & Cicchino, 1989 (Argentina)
- Baripus flaccus Roig-Juñent & Cicchino, 1989 (Argentina)
- Baripus gentilii Roig-Juñent, 1992 (Argentina)
- Baripus giaii Roig-Juñent, 1992 (Argentina)
- Baripus longitarsis (G.R.Waterhouse, 1841) (Argentina)
- Baripus mendozensis Roig-Juñent & Cicchino, 1989 (Argentina)
- Baripus merloensis Roig-Juñent & Quiroga, 2021 (Argentina)
- Baripus minus Roig-Juñent, 1992 (Argentina)
- Baripus neuquensis Roig-Juñent, 1992 (Argentina)
- Baripus nevado Roig-Juñent, 2008 (Argentina)
- Baripus nigripennis Oberthür, 1883 (Uruguay)
- Baripus painensis Roig-Juñent & Cicchino, 1989 (Chile)
- Baripus paralellus (Guérin-Méneville, 1838) (Chile)
- Baripus precordillera Roig-Juñent, 2008 (Argentina)
- Baripus pulchellus Burmeister, 1868 (Argentina)
- Baripus puntano Roig-Juñent & Quiroga, 2021 (Argentina)
- Baripus rivalis (Germar, 1823) (Argentina)
- Baripus schajovskoii Roig-Juñent, 1992 (Argentina)
- Baripus speciosus Dejean, 1831 (Uruguay)
- Baripus sulcatipenis Roig-Juñent, 1992 (Argentina)
