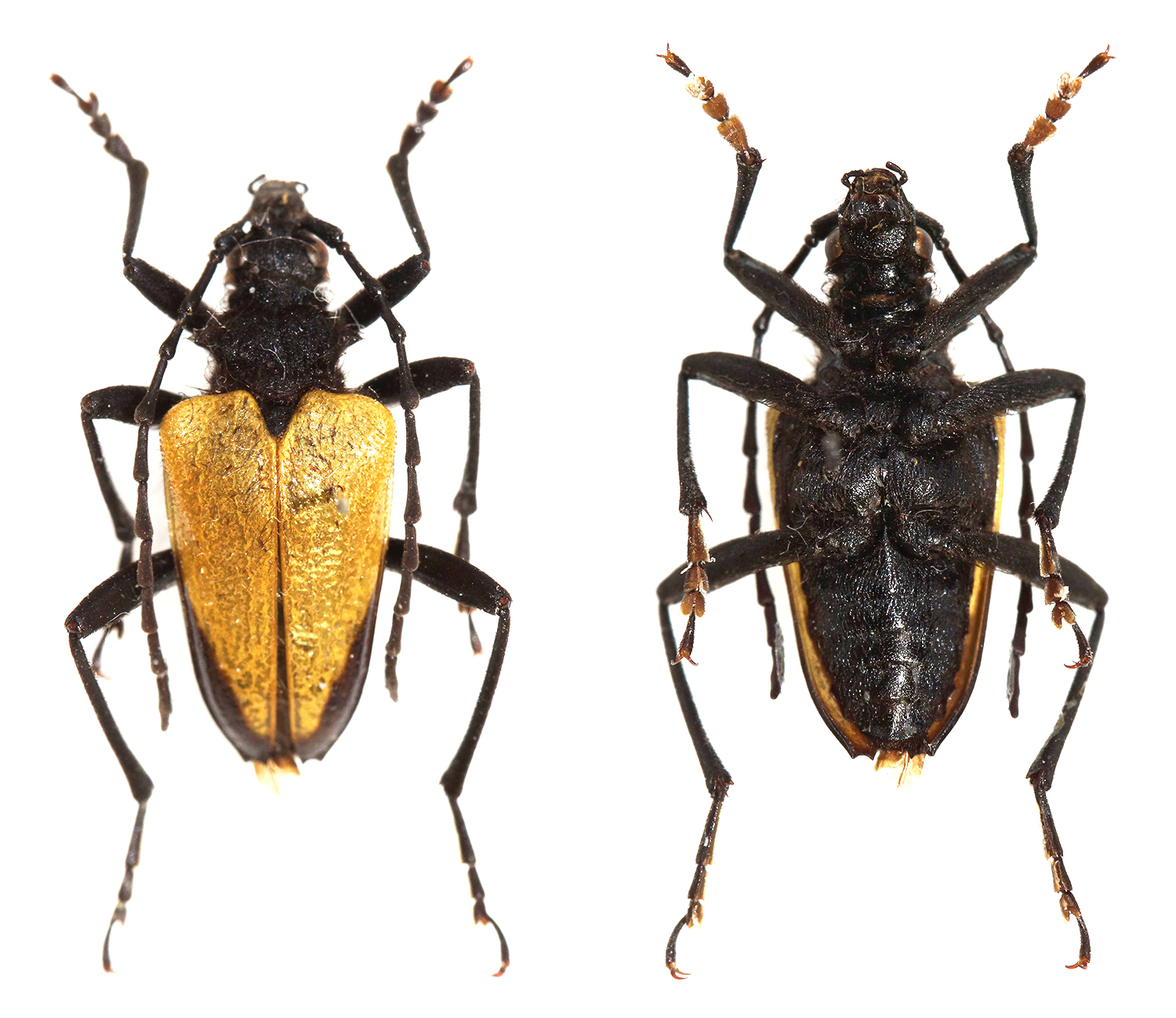
- Pachyta armata on flower in Spirea genus, in Oregon

Scientific classification
- Domain: Eukaryota
- Kingdom: Animalia
- Phylum: Arthropoda
- Class: Insecta
- Order: Coleoptera
- Suborder: Polyphaga
- Infraorder: Cucujiformia
- Family: Cerambycidae
- Genus: Pachyta
- Species: P. armata

Binomial name
- Pachyta armata LeConte, 1873

= Pachyta armata =

Species of beetle

Pachyta armata is the species of the Lepturinae subfamily in long-horned beetle family. This beetle is distributed in United States.
