= Eurylychnus =

Scientific classification
- Kingdom: Animalia
- Phylum: Arthropoda
- Class: Insecta
- Order: Coleoptera
- Suborder: Adephaga
- Family: Carabidae
- Subfamily: Broscinae
- Tribe: Broscini
- Subtribe: Nothobroscina
- Genus: Eurylychnus; Bates, 1891

Genus of beetles

Eurylychnus is a genus of beetles in the family Carabidae. Eurylychnus contains the following species, found in Australia.

- Eurylychnus blagravii (Castelnau, 1868)
- Eurylychnus cylindricus Sloane, 1916
- Eurylychnus dyschirioides (Castelnau, 1868)
- Eurylychnus femoralis Sloane, 1915
- Eurylychnus kershawi Sloane, 1915
- Eurylychnus ovipennis Sloane, 1915
- Eurylychnus regularis Sloane, 1911
- Eurylychnus victoriae Sloane, 1892
