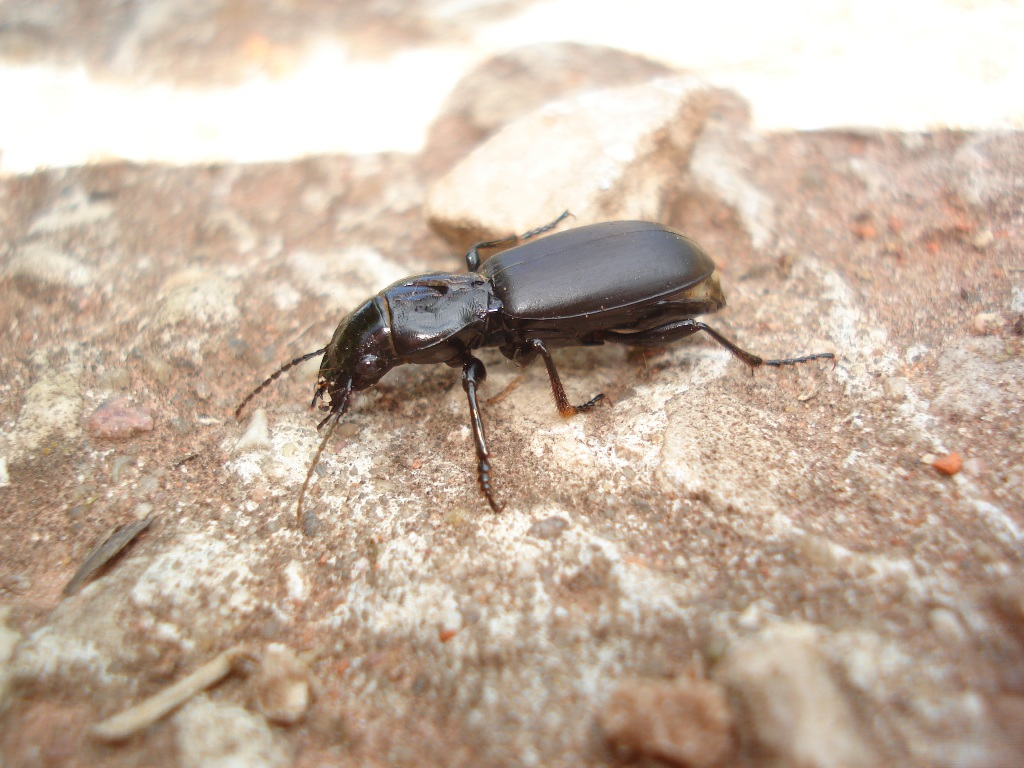

Scientific classification
- Kingdom: Animalia
- Phylum: Arthropoda
- Class: Insecta
- Order: Coleoptera
- Suborder: Adephaga
- Family: Carabidae
- Genus: Broscus
- Species: B. cephalotes

Binomial name
- Broscus cephalotes (Linnaeus, 1758)

= Broscus cephalotes =

Species of beetle

Broscus cephalotes is a species of nocturnal, coastal ground beetle found throughout most of Europe. Its range spans from western Europe into western Siberia. The species was introduced recently (circa 1975) in the eastern areas of Canada and has spread farther south and west into the United States. As a member of the family Carabidae, Broscus cephalotes is generally considered beneficial to humans due to its predatory habits. Their varied diet often includes crop pests and other small organisms.

== Description ==
Broscus cephalotes has a dull black coloration, without any metallic hue, and it can be quite large: between 16 and 23 mm. The morphology of the beetle is similar to other beetles in its family. B. cephalotes is flightless and flatter than many other species of Carabidae, which helps it hide in close spaces (e.g. crevices under stones or under bark). Body shape and presence or absence of the ability of flight can provide clues to diet of beetles, but does not provide conclusive evidence. Although mouth-parts are a better indicator of the type of food consumed by the beetle, the best method of determining the diet of a beetle is gut dissection. The asymmetric mandibles of B. cephalotes are blunt and twice as long as they are wide. The mandibles are curved to a rounded point at the end, with the left mandible is slightly longer and wider than the right mandible. These mandibles are multi-purpose tools. The beetle uses them to create and maintain the tunnels in which they spend most of their lives. The opened mandibles can act as shovels or pull dirt and debris from the walls of their tunnels and deposit it outside the burrow. Additionally, the mandibles can act as shovels in the loose sand of the beetles’ coastal habitat. Another critical use of the mandibles is in feeding, as discussed below.

== Feeding ==
Broscus cephalotes are primarily carnivorous beetles; however they will consume a wide variety of food. They are generalists, and the adults do not discriminate much in what they consume. A recent study showed that B. cephalotes in laboratory conditions will attack everything that runs across the opening of its burrow, though they preferred to attack and eat woodlice and ants. Some of what has been found in various beetles’ digestive tract include: plant material and various types of insects: ants, wolf spiders, Aphididae, caterpillars, Diptera, Acarina, Bibionidae, Coleoptera, adult Lepidoptera, and Heteroptera. However, there has been no evidence of cannibalism in this species of beetle. The diet of the larvae of this family has not been as widely studied because the larvae spend their time in tunnels and are difficult to identify even when not hidden in the soil. Carabidae larvae are usually more carnivorous than adults and have a more restricted diet. The limited diet may be due to their subterranean habitat and their small size. Additionally, the larvae of Carabidae beetle tend to be fluid feeders, regardless of their status as adults.

Broscus cephalotes has two main methods to detect prey: tactile cues and olfactory cues. The olfactory cues, however, do not seem to be very specific, as the responses to the cue do not correspond strongly to preference of prey. The beetle, once in possession of its prey, holds the organism with its forelegs and tears off pieces of the organism to consume. The mandibles are used to tear open the cuticular structures of its meal and expose the soft tissue areas within the organism. Fluid is produced in the mouth during feeding that causes the discoloration of flesh and begins the digestive process. This fluid is composed of a variety of enzymes that begin the digestive process before the prey has entered the beetle’s digestive tract. Many samples of B. cephalotes were found to have sand in their digestive tract in addition to prey. Sand in the digestive tract may help the beetle grind up the tougher parts of the prey, although it has not yet been determined if the sand is ingested for this purpose.

== Habitat and habits ==
Broscus cephalotes can be found all across temperate western and central Europe, extending into western Siberia. Specimens are usually found in the coastal regions, but can also be found more rarely inland. It generally can be found in the vegetated dunes on the coast, but prefers the more sparsely vegetated areas.

The first appearance of B. cephalotes in North America was recorded in Nova Scotia in 1978. It seemed as though the species was well established in the area at the time, but still a relatively new arrival. The species is still confined to the eastern seaboard in North America and is less common than in Europe.

Broscus cephalotes are mostly nocturnal, although they have been seen scurrying from one hiding place to another during the day. They hide during the day burrowed under logs and stones in loose, dry sand. They have been known to rest in groups, but no evidence points to that being the norm or anything but a matter of convenience. Their nocturnal lifestyle may be helpful in the acquisition of prey. As the beetles are active during the night, they can more easily capture prey that is diurnal. Nocturnal habits also reduce the number of predators active while the beetle is active.

Most adults do not live through the winter, but the larvae develop during the winter months and emerge as adults in the spring and summer.

Fighting in the species has been observed under artificial daylight, but the purpose of the fighting has not been determined. Fighting could be over resources like food, burrows, or mates.

== Reproduction and life cycle ==
Broscus cephalotes breed in the early autumn, when the temperature is still warm and the air still dry. The eggs are deposited deep into the sandy soil during late summer and early autumn. The site of oviposition is determined and prepared by the female beetle. After the eggs are laid there is no parental care. The eggs hatch and the larvae develop in the tunnels during the winter and early spring. The larvae spend all their time below the surface, and consequently, are not well studied. The adult beetles emerge from the burrows in the late spring and early summer. All individuals generally emerge by early July. The period of reproduction generally spans from the end of July to mid-September, with the first larvae developing at the end of August. This can lead to some individuals developing on a one-year schedule and others developing on a two-year schedule. However, most die after their first year of life, and only reproduce once. Some specimens have been kept alive in laboratories for much longer than one year.

In many beetles in this family, higher temperatures correlate to long reproductive periods and more eggs laid. Lower temperatures correlate to a shortened reproductive period and fewer eggs produced, despite the presence of an abundance of food. However, laboratory settings may give a skewed view of the reality of these beetles. There have not been comprehensive field studies on effect of temperature on reproductive success in carabid beetles of any type.

== Predators ==
Birds are major predators of B. cephalotes, which use invertebrates to provide a protein-rich diet for their chicks. Some species of corvid and raptor birds eat carabid beetles as adults as well. Farmland birds depend heavily on carabids for food. Small mammals, amphibians and reptiles may also prey on B. cephalotes. Mammals, such as hedgehogs, shrews and mice inhabiting areas far from crops often consume these beetles. The beetles constitute a significant (20%) portion of these mammals’ diet in June. This is primarily due to the beetles’ life cycle, as they are most numerous in June.

== Humans and Broscus cephalotes ==
In Britain, there has been a large reduction in the area covered by heath lands over the past 150 years. This reduction has been largely due to human activity; expanding industrial and residential areas have reduced the available and habitable heath land. While the heath lands are not known for diversity in flora, the invertebrate fauna in the region rely on the heath lands for survival. The remaining habitats in Britain are cut through and connected by roadways. There has been concern in the past that roadways disrupt the habitats of B. cephalotes and that the roads interfere with breeding. However, recent studies show that the sandy roadsides can link habitats and create refuges for the beetles. This leads to greater survival and reproduction in the ground beetle population.

It is in farmers’ interests for these beetles to continue surviving and reproducing successfully. B. cephalotes have been recognized as useful to farmers since the early nineteenth century. Many of their prey fall under the category of crop pests, such as aphids, slugs and dipteran eggs. However, farmers have only recently begun to consider these beetles in their crop rotations. Renewed interest in the role of beetles in crop rotations can partially be explained by the decreased value of crops and pressure from environmental groups use more environmentally friendly farming practices. Most of the more recently adopted farming practices (e.g. selective insecticides and augmenting non-crop habitat) will affect the population of ground beetles, but not immediately. Pest management effects will not be noticeable until more extensive measures are implemented.
