= Percolestus =

Scientific classification
- Kingdom: Animalia
- Phylum: Arthropoda
- Class: Insecta
- Order: Coleoptera
- Suborder: Adephaga
- Family: Carabidae
- Subfamily: Broscinae
- Tribe: Broscini
- Subtribe: Nothobroscina
- Genus: Percolestus; Sloane, 1892
- Species: P. blackburni

Binomial name
- Percolestus blackburni Sloane, 1892

Genus of beetles

Percolestus blackburni is a species of beetle in the family Carabidae, the only species in the genus Percolestus.
