= Broscodera insignis =

Scientific classification
- Domain: Eukaryota
- Kingdom: Animalia
- Phylum: Arthropoda
- Class: Insecta
- Order: Coleoptera
- Suborder: Adephaga
- Family: Carabidae
- Genus: Broscodera
- Species: B. insignis

Binomial name
- Broscodera insignis (Mannerheim, 1852)

Species of beetle

Broscodera insignis is a species of ground beetle in the family Carabidae. It is found in North America.
