= Bembidiomorphum =

Scientific classification
- Domain: Eukaryota
- Kingdom: Animalia
- Phylum: Arthropoda
- Class: Insecta
- Order: Coleoptera
- Suborder: Adephaga
- Family: Carabidae
- Subfamily: Broscinae
- Tribe: Broscini
- Subtribe: Baripodina
- Genus: Bembidiomorphum; Champion, 1918

Synonyms
- Microbarypus Roig-Juñent, 2000

Genus of beetles

Bembidiomorphum is a genus of ground beetles in the Carabidae family . There are two described species in Bembidiomorphum, found in Chile.

== Species ==
These two species belong to the genus Bembidiomorphum:

- Bembidiomorphum convexum Champion, 1918
- Bembidiomorphum silvicola (Roig-Juñent, 2000)
