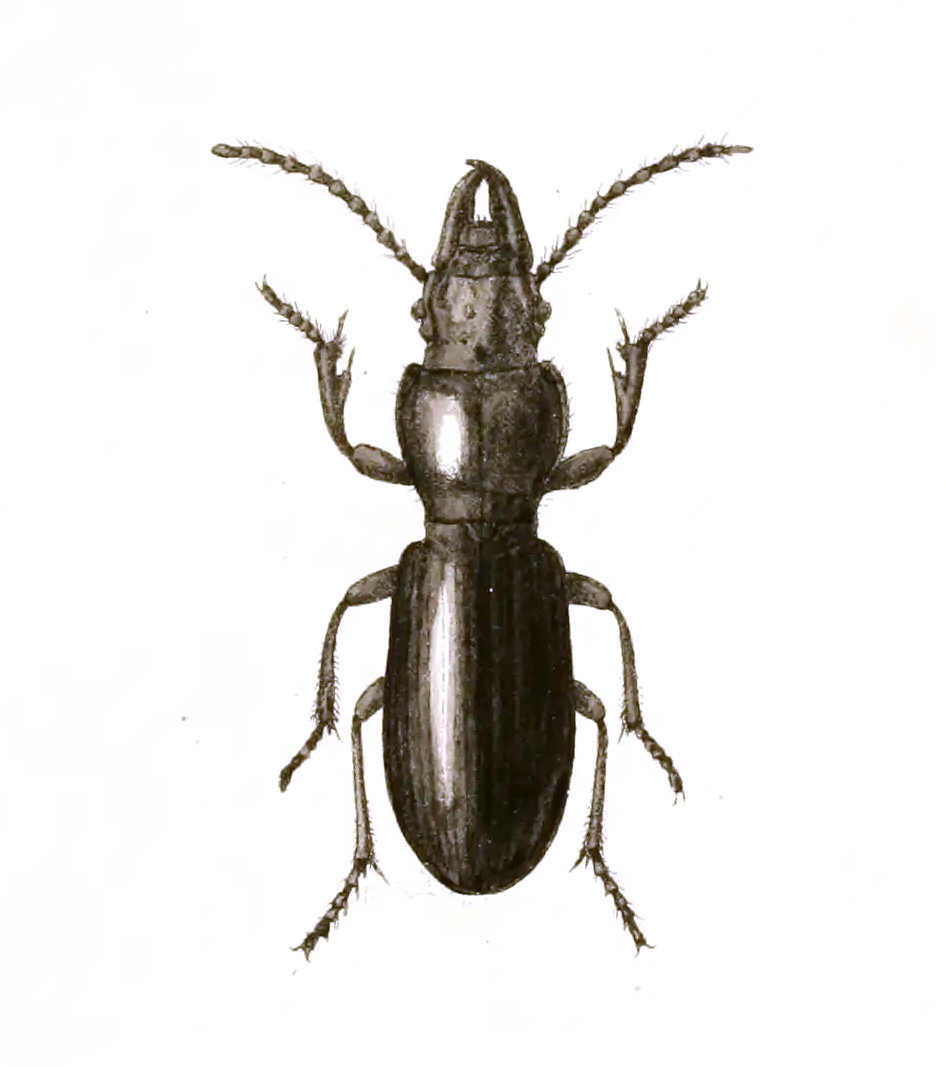
- Percosoma sulcipenne Bates, 1878

Scientific classification
- Kingdom: Animalia
- Phylum: Arthropoda
- Clade: Pancrustacea
- Class: Insecta
- Order: Coleoptera
- Suborder: Adephaga
- Family: Carabidae
- Subfamily: Broscinae
- Tribe: Broscini
- Subtribe: Nothobroscina
- Genus: Percosoma; Schaum, 1858

= Percosoma =

Genus of beetles

Percosoma is an Australian endemic genus of beetles in the family Carabidae, containing the following species:

- Percosoma carenoides (White, 1846) is often found in southern Tasmanian forests.
- Percosoma sulcipenne Bates, 1878
