= Chudenice =

- Market town
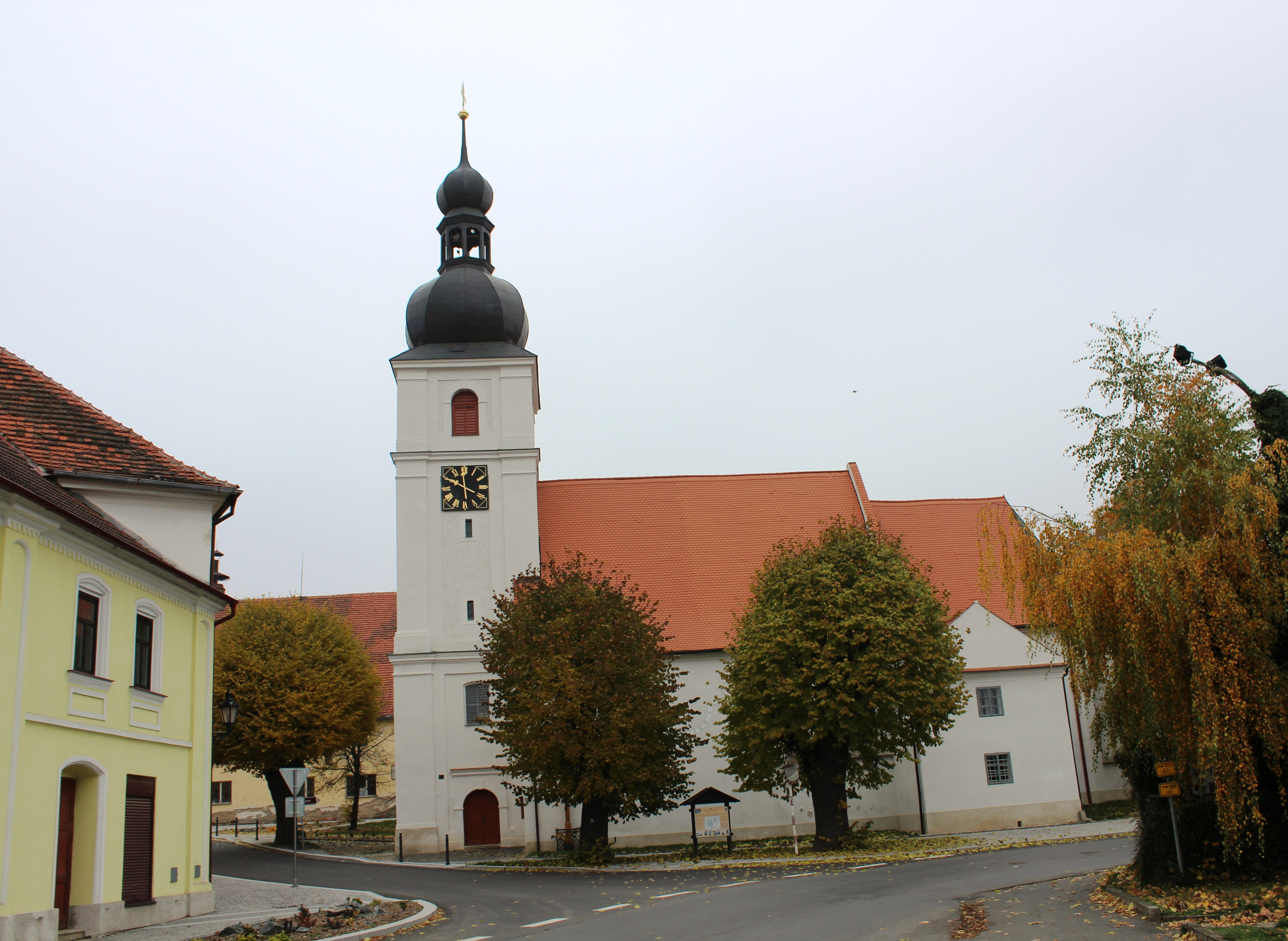
- Church of Saint John the Baptist

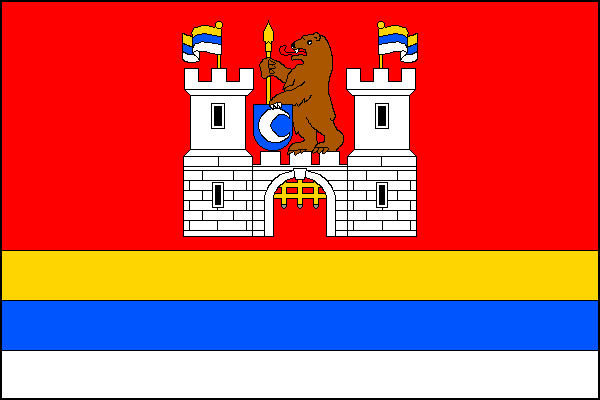
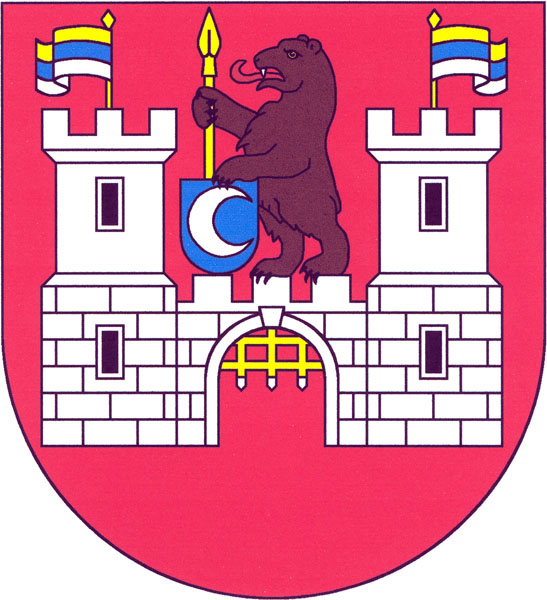
- Flag Coat of arms

- Location in the Czech Republic
- Coordinates: 49°28′2″N 13°10′27″E
- Country: Czech Republic
- Region: Plzeň
- District: Klatovy
- First mentioned: 1200

Area
  - Total: 21.13 km^{2} (8.16 sq mi)
- Elevation: 488 m (1,601 ft)

Population (2026-01-01)
  - Total: 777
  - Density: 36.8/km^{2} (95.2/sq mi)
- Time zone: UTC+1 (CET)
  - Summer (DST): UTC+2 (CEST)
- Postal codes: 339 01, 340 12
- Website: www.chudenice.info

Chudenice (Czech pronunciation: [ˈxudɛɲɪtsɛ]; German: Chudenitz) is a market town in Klatovy District in the Plzeň Region of the Czech Republic. It has about 800 inhabitants.

== Administrative division ==
Chudenice consists of five municipal parts (in brackets population according to the 2021 census):

- Chudenice (646)
- Bezpravovice (17)
- Býšov (4)
- Lučice (36)
- Slatina (30)

== Etymology ==
During the history of the settlement, the names Chudenice and Chuděnice appeared alternately, before the name became stable in the 20th century. The name is derived from the personal name Chuděna, meaning "the village of Chuděna's people".

== Geography ==
Chudenice is located about 11 kilometres (7 mi) northwest of Klatovy and 33 km (21 mi) southwest of Plzeň. It lies in the Švihov Highlands. The highest point is a hill at 697 m (2,287 ft) above sea level.

== History ==
The first written mention of Chudenice is from 1200. From the first half of the 13th century until 1945, Chudenice was continuously owned by the Czernin family. In 1592, the village was promoted to a market town by Emperor Rudolf II.

== Demographics ==
Historical population

Year	Pop.	±%
1869	1,601	—
1880	1,620	+1.2%
1890	1,536	−5.2%
1900	1,508	−1.8%
1910	1,536	+1.9%

Year	Pop.	±%
1921	1,533	−0.2%
1930	1,391	−9.3%
1950	1,157	−16.8%
1961	1,120	−3.2%
1970	911	−18.7%

Year	Pop.	±%
1980	820	−10.0%
1991	730	−11.0%
2001	695	−4.8%
2011	757	+8.9%
2021	733	−3.2%

Source: Censuses

== Transport ==
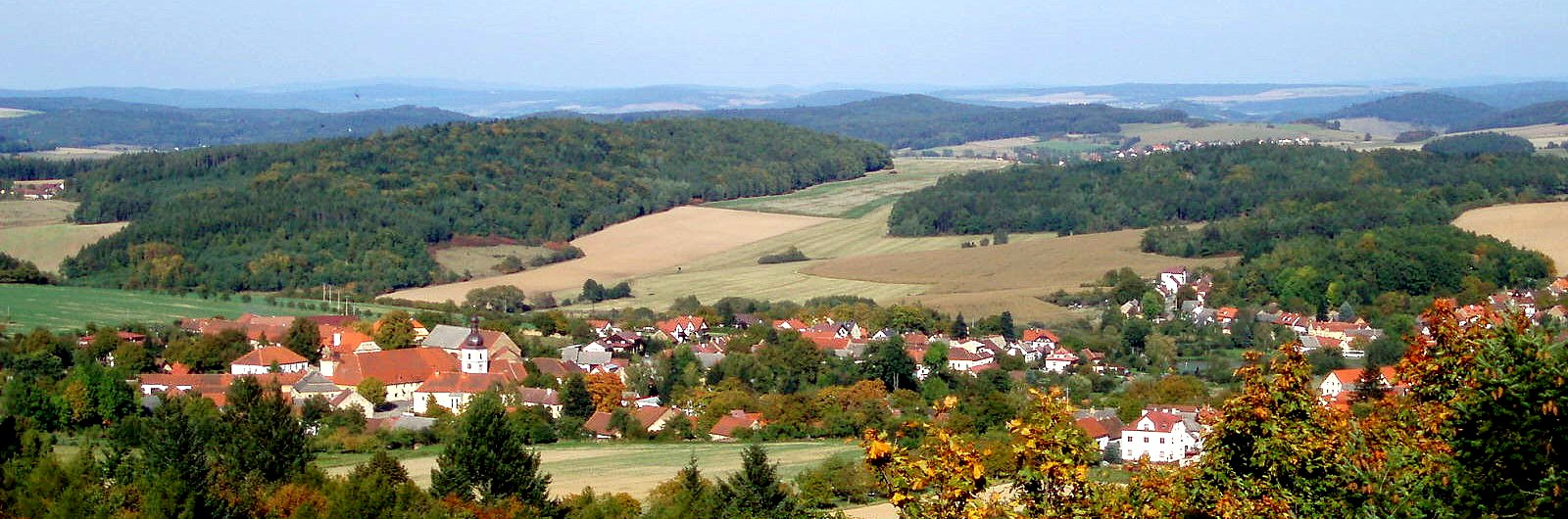
General view

There are no railways or major roads passing through the municipal territory.

== Sights ==
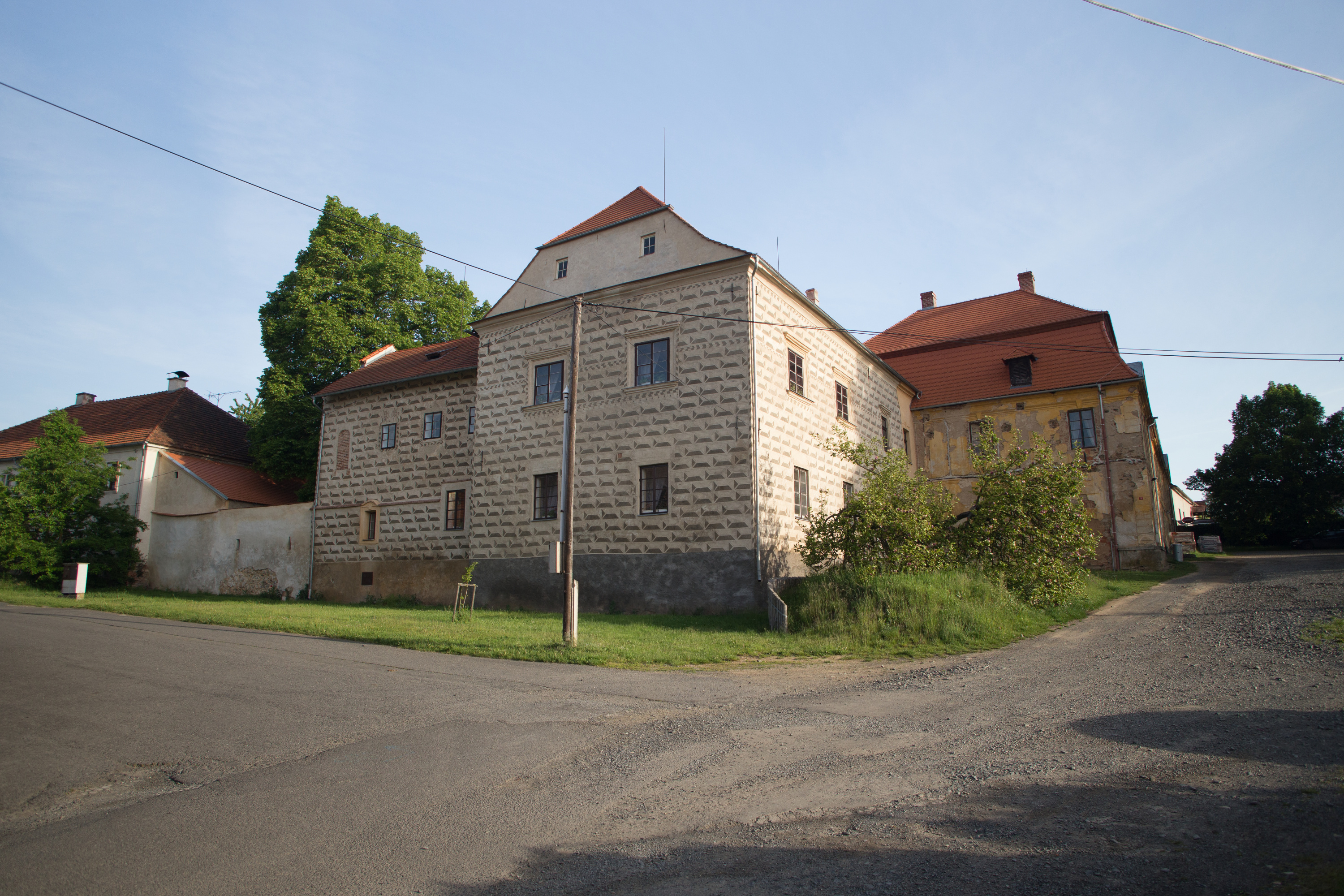
Old Chudenice Castle

The Old Chudenice Castle was originally a medieval fortress, rebuilt into a Renaissance residence at the end of the 16th century. Its present appearance is a result of Baroque and Neoclassical modifications. A part of the valuable castle complex is a former brewery from the 16th century. Today the castle is owned by Chudenice. It is open to the public and offers guided tours. The northern wing houses the Museum of Josef Dobrovský.

The Lázeň Castle is a former summer house of the Czernin family. It was originally a Baroque spa building, rebuilt in the Empire style in 1849–1859. Around the castle is a landscape park with dendrologically valuable trees.

The Church of Saint John the Baptist was built in the Gothic style in the mid-14th century. Later it was modified in the Baroque style. The tower was added in 1660. The interior is decorated with valuable Gothic paintings from the 15th century.

The remains of the former pilgrimage Church of Saint Wolfgang is a tower. The church was built in the Baroque style in 1722–1729 by František Maxmilián Kaňka. It was abolished in 1785. A Neoclassical chapel was added to the tower in 1772. The church tower was changed to an observation tower in 1845. Today the tower is called Bolfánek.

== Notable people ==
- Josef Reicha (1752–1795), cellist
- Jaroslav Kvapil (1868–1950), writer
- Jan Roubal (1880–1971), entomologist
