= Pachyta mediofasciata =

Scientific classification
- Kingdom: Animalia
- Phylum: Arthropoda
- Class: Insecta
- Order: Coleoptera
- Suborder: Polyphaga
- Infraorder: Cucujiformia
- Family: Cerambycidae
- Genus: Pachyta
- Species: P. mediofasciata

Binomial name
- Pachyta mediofasciata Pic, 1936

Species of beetle

Pachyta mediofasciata is the species of the Lepturinae subfamily in long-horned beetle family. This beetle is distributed in China.
