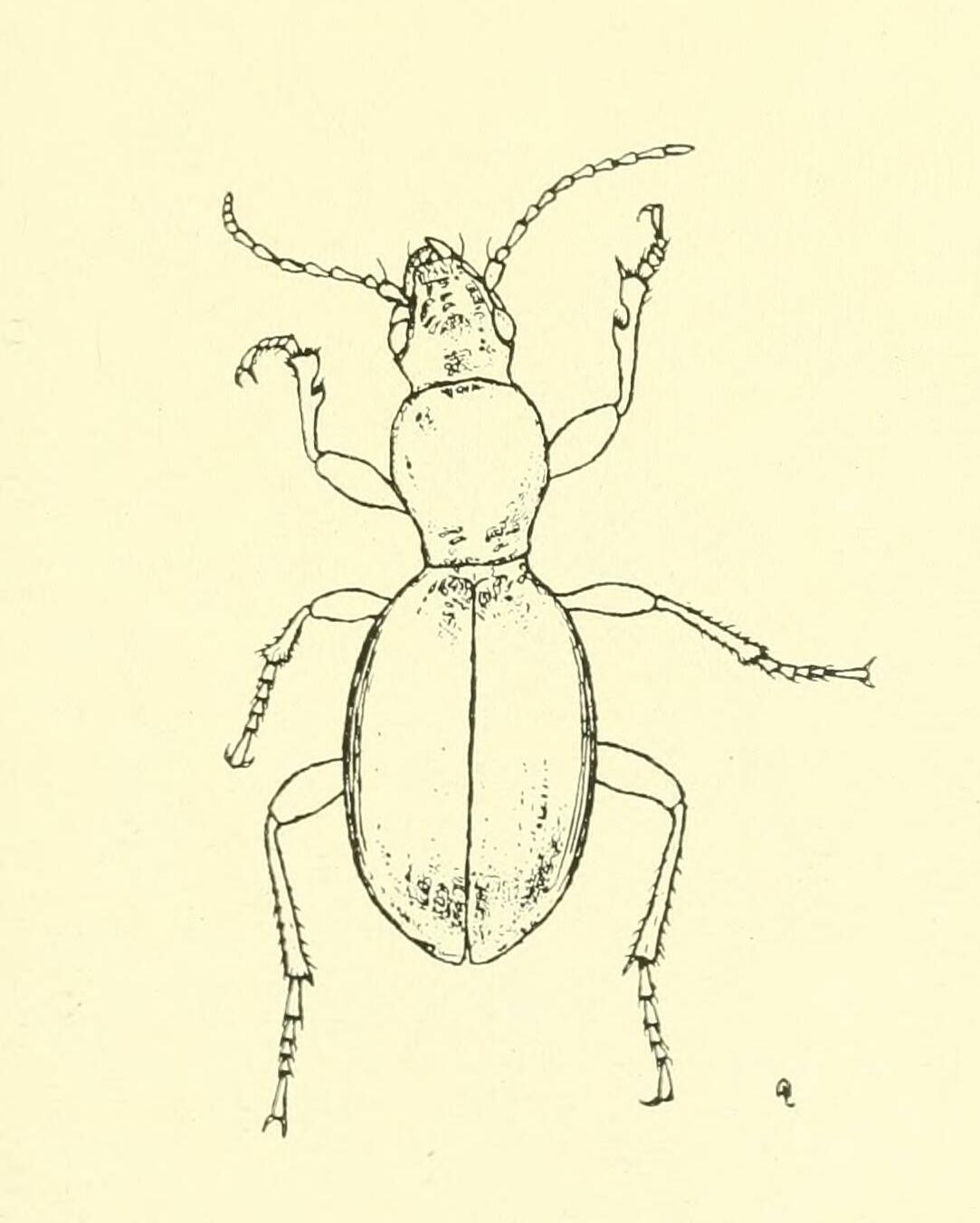
- Broscosoma baldense

Scientific classification
- Domain: Eukaryota
- Kingdom: Animalia
- Phylum: Arthropoda
- Class: Insecta
- Order: Coleoptera
- Suborder: Adephaga
- Family: Carabidae
- Subfamily: Broscinae
- Tribe: Broscini
- Subtribe: Broscina
- Genus: Broscosoma; Rosenhauer, 1846

= Broscosoma =

Genus of beetles

Broscosoma is a genus in the beetle family Carabidae. There are more than 40 described species in Broscosoma, found in Asia.

== Species ==
These 43 species belong to the genus Broscosoma:

- Broscosoma annemariae Deuve, 2004 (Nepal)
- Broscosoma baldense Rosenhauer, 1846 (Italy)
- Broscosoma benesi Dvorak, 2006 (Nepal)
- Broscosoma businskae Dvorak, 1998 (China)
- Broscosoma convexum Deuve, 1983 (Nepal)
- Broscosoma danbaense Deuve, 2014 (China)
- Broscosoma deuvei Lassalle, 1982 (Nepal)
- Broscosoma doenitzi (Harold, 1881) (Japan)
- Broscosoma dostali Deuve, 2006 (China)
- Broscosoma dostalianum Deuve, 2014 (Nepal)
- Broscosoma farkaci Sciaky & Facchini, 2005 (China)
- Broscosoma gaoligongense Deuve & Wrase, 2015 (China)
- Broscosoma gracile Andrewes, 1927 (India)
- Broscosoma guoliangi Jiang; Liu & Wang, 2021 (China)
- Broscosoma guttuliforme Deuve, 1985 (Nepal)
- Broscosoma herculeanum Deuve, 2011 (China)
- Broscosoma janatai Deuve, 2008 (China)
- Broscosoma jintangense Deuve, 2008 (China)
- Broscosoma kalabi Deuve, 1993 (China)
- Broscosoma kalabianum Deuve, 2014 (China)
- Broscosoma lumbasumba Deuve, 2011 (Nepal)
- Broscosoma monticola Habu, 1973 (Nepal)
- Broscosoma montreuili Deuve, 2006 (China)
- Broscosoma moriturum Semenov, 1900 (China)
- Broscosoma mourzinei Deuve, 2011 (China)
- Broscosoma qiului Jiang; Liu & Wang, 2021 (China)
- Broscosoma relictum Weissmandl, 1936 (Italy)
- Broscosoma ribbei Putzeys, 1877 (China, India, and Vietnam)
- Broscosoma rolex Morvan, 1995 (Nepal)
- Broscosoma schawalleri Deuve, 1990 (Nepal)
- Broscosoma sehnali Deuve, 2006 (China)
- Broscosoma semenovi Belousov & Kataev, 1990 (Russia)
- Broscosoma sichuanum Deuve, 1990 (China)
- Broscosoma stefani Sciaky & Facchini, 2005 (China)
- Broscosoma surkiense Deuve, 2004 (Nepal)
- Broscosoma tawangense Deuve, 2006 (India)
- Broscosoma tiani Deuve, 2006 (China)
- Broscosoma tibetanum Facchini, 2002 (China)
- Broscosoma uenoi Habu, 1973 (Taiwan)
- Broscosoma valainisi Barsevskis, 2010 (China)
- Broscosoma xuechengense Deuve, 2008 (China)
- Broscosoma xuhaoi Jiang; Feng & Wand, 2020 (China)
- Broscosoma zhengyuandongi Jiang; Feng & Wand, 2020 (China)
