= Jan Roubal =

Jan Roubal (16 August 1880 in Chudenice – 23 October 1971 in Prague) was a pioneer Czech entomologist who specialized in the systematics of beetles, especially the Staphylinidae, and is best known for his three-volume Catalogue of Coleoptera in Slovakia and Subcarpathian Ruthenia, published from 1930 to 1941.

Roubal was born in Chudenice to Jakub Roubal and Marie née Kašparovová. He graduated from the Klatovy Gymnasium and graduated with studies in natural sciences at Charles University, Prague before teaching in schools from 1905 to 1919 at Příbram and then becoming a headmaster at a girls' school in Banská Bystrica where he stayed until 1938. In his spare time, he made trips and collected beetles from the region which were estimated to number 160,000 specimens. His entomological work intensified after he retired in 1940. Roubal was also involved in conservation. Towards the end of his life he began to study Heteroptera. His specimens are now housed in the Slovenské národné múzeum, Bratislava.
