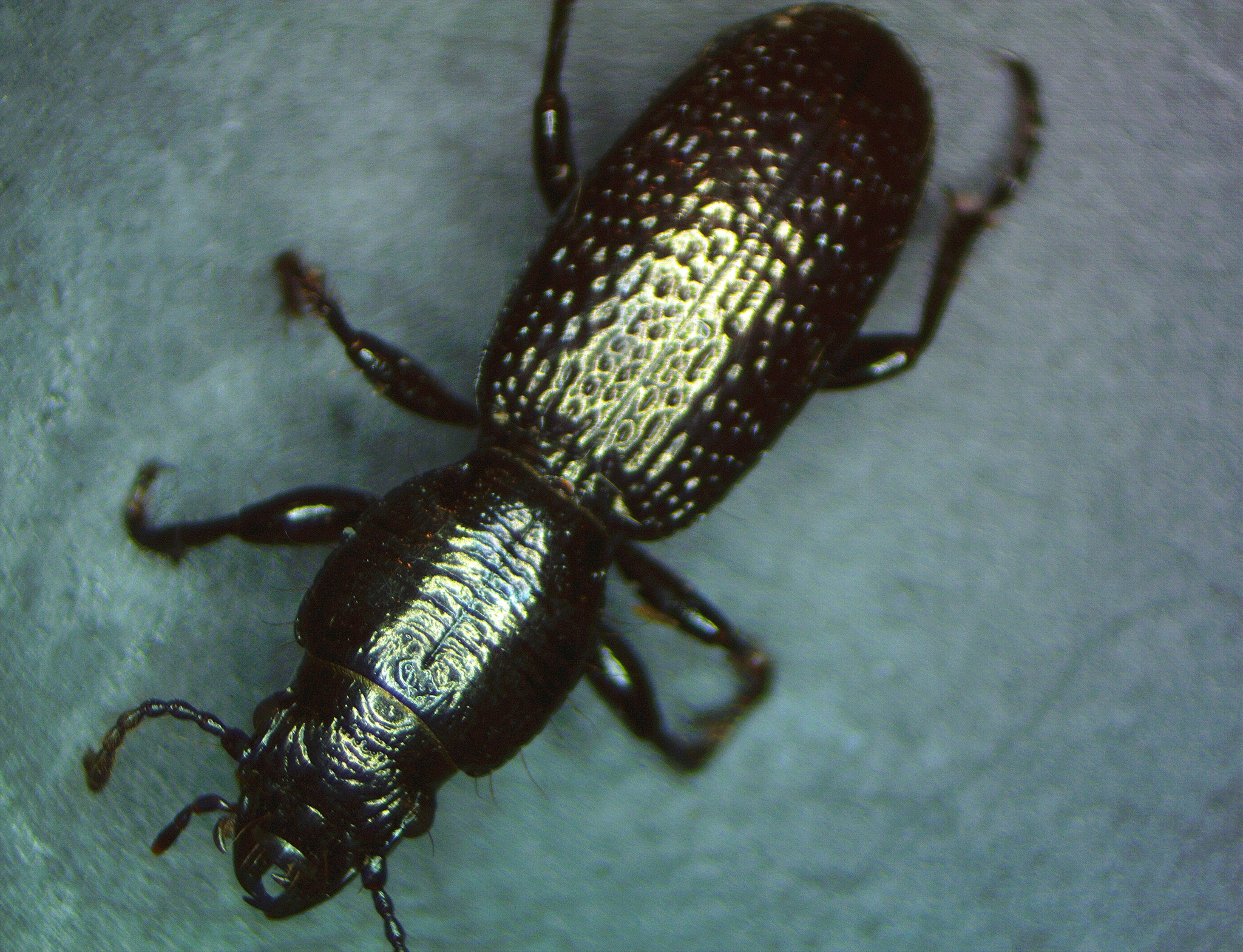
- New Zealand

Scientific classification
- Kingdom: Animalia
- Phylum: Arthropoda
- Clade: Pancrustacea
- Class: Insecta
- Order: Coleoptera
- Suborder: Adephaga
- Family: Carabidae
- Subfamily: Broscinae; Hope, 1838

= Broscinae =

Subfamily of beetles

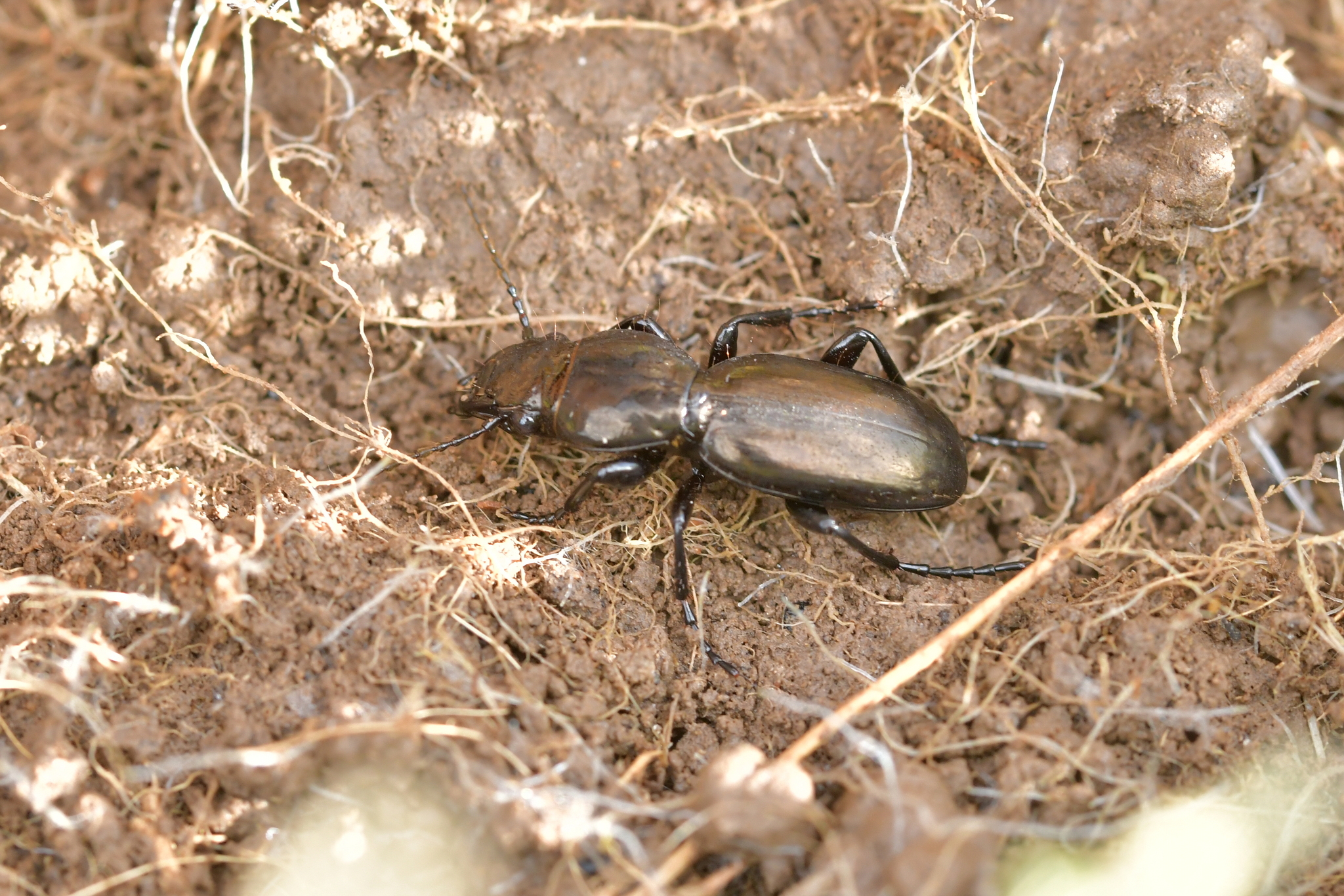
Oregus aereus, New Zealand

Broscinae is a subfamily of ground beetles in the family Carabidae. There are more than 30 genera and at least 340 described species in Broscinae.

== Genera ==
These 34 genera belong to the subfamily Broscinae:

- Acallistus Sharp, 1886
- Adotela Laporte, 1867
- Anheterus Putzeys, 1868
- Baripus Dejean, 1828
- Bembidiomorphum Champion, 1918
- Bountya Townsend, 1971
- Brithysternum W.J.MacLeay, 1873
- Broscodera Lindroth, 1961
- Broscodes Bolivar y Pieltain, 1914
- Broscosoma Rosenhauer, 1846
- Broscus Panzer, 1813
- Cascellius Curtis, 1838
- Cerotalis Laporte, 1867
- Chaetobroscus Semenov, 1900
- Chylnus Sloane, 1920
- Craspedonotus Schaum, 1863
- Creobius Guérin-Méneville, 1838
- Diglymma Sharp, 1886
- Eobroscus Kryzhanovskij, 1951
- Eurylychnus Bates, 1891
- Gnathoxys Westwood, 1842
- Kashmirobroscus J.Schmidt; Wrase & Sciaky, 2013
- Mecodema Blanchard, 1843
- Miscodera Eschscholtz, 1830
- Monteremita Seldon & Holwell, 2019
- Nothobroscus Roig-Juñent & Ball, 1995
- Nothocascellius Roig-Juñent, 1995
- Oregus Putzeys, 1868
- Orthoglymma Liebherr; Marris; Emberson; Syrett & Roig-Juñent, 2011
- Percolestus Sloane, 1892
- Percosoma Schaum, 1858
- Promecoderus Dejean, 1829
- Rawlinsius Davidson & Ball, 1998
- Zacotus LeConte, 1869
