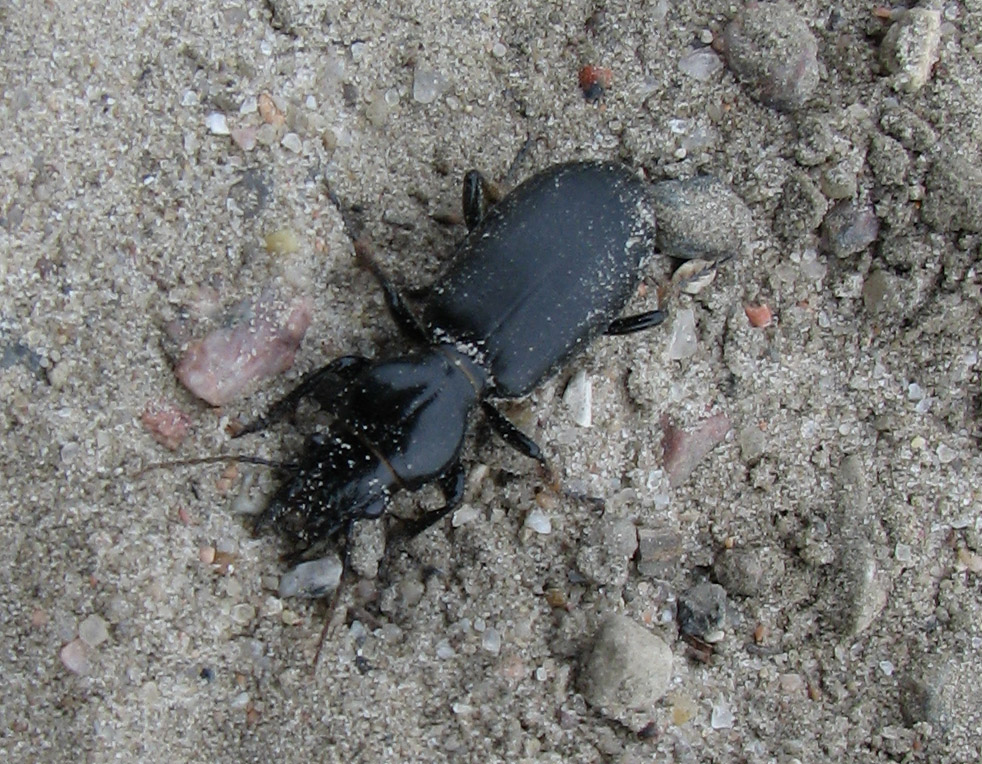

Scientific classification
- Domain: Eukaryota
- Kingdom: Animalia
- Phylum: Arthropoda
- Class: Insecta
- Order: Coleoptera
- Suborder: Adephaga
- Family: Carabidae
- Subfamily: Broscinae
- Tribe: Broscini; Hope, 1838

Synonyms
- Broschidae Hope, 1838 (misspelling); Broscides Putzeys, 1868; Cnemacanthides Lacordaire, 1854; Zacotini Horn, 1882

= Broscini =

Tribe of insects

The tribe Broscini is a worldwide group of beetles in the Broscinae subfamily of Carabidae (the ground beetles).

== Description ==
Broscini is divided into five subtribes:

- Axonyina: 3 genera (Oriental-Palearctic-Neotropical).
- Broscina: 9 genera (Holoarctic-Oriental).
- Nothobroscina: 10 genera (Australian-Neotropical).
- Barypina: 2 genera (Neotropical).
- Creobiina: 11 genera (Australian-Neotropical).
