= Albert James Allom =

New Zealand artist and civil servant

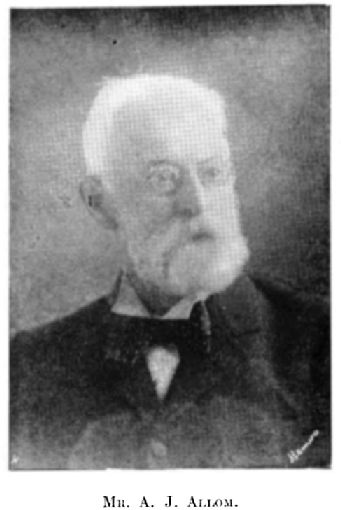
- Born: December 20, 1825; Holloway, London, England
- Died: February 16, 1909 (aged 83)
- Burial place: St Mark's Church, Remuera
- Spouse: Eliza Horn (m. 1856)
- Father: Thomas Allom

Albert James Allom (1825–1909) was an English-born New Zealand artist, architect, civil servant, and surveyor active in New Zealand. Raised and educated in London, as the son of noted architect Thomas Allom, Allom set off for New Zealand to survey for the New Zealand Company and despite his training as an architect, Allom never had employment as an architect. Allom travelled across New Zealand doing survey work before later returning to England and gaining a position in the Colonial Office in the West Indies. Allom retired from his position in the Colonial Office to head a company involved in Great Barrier Island, when the company fell into liquidation he moved to the Thames Goldfields and worked in administrative roles for the government.

== Early life ==
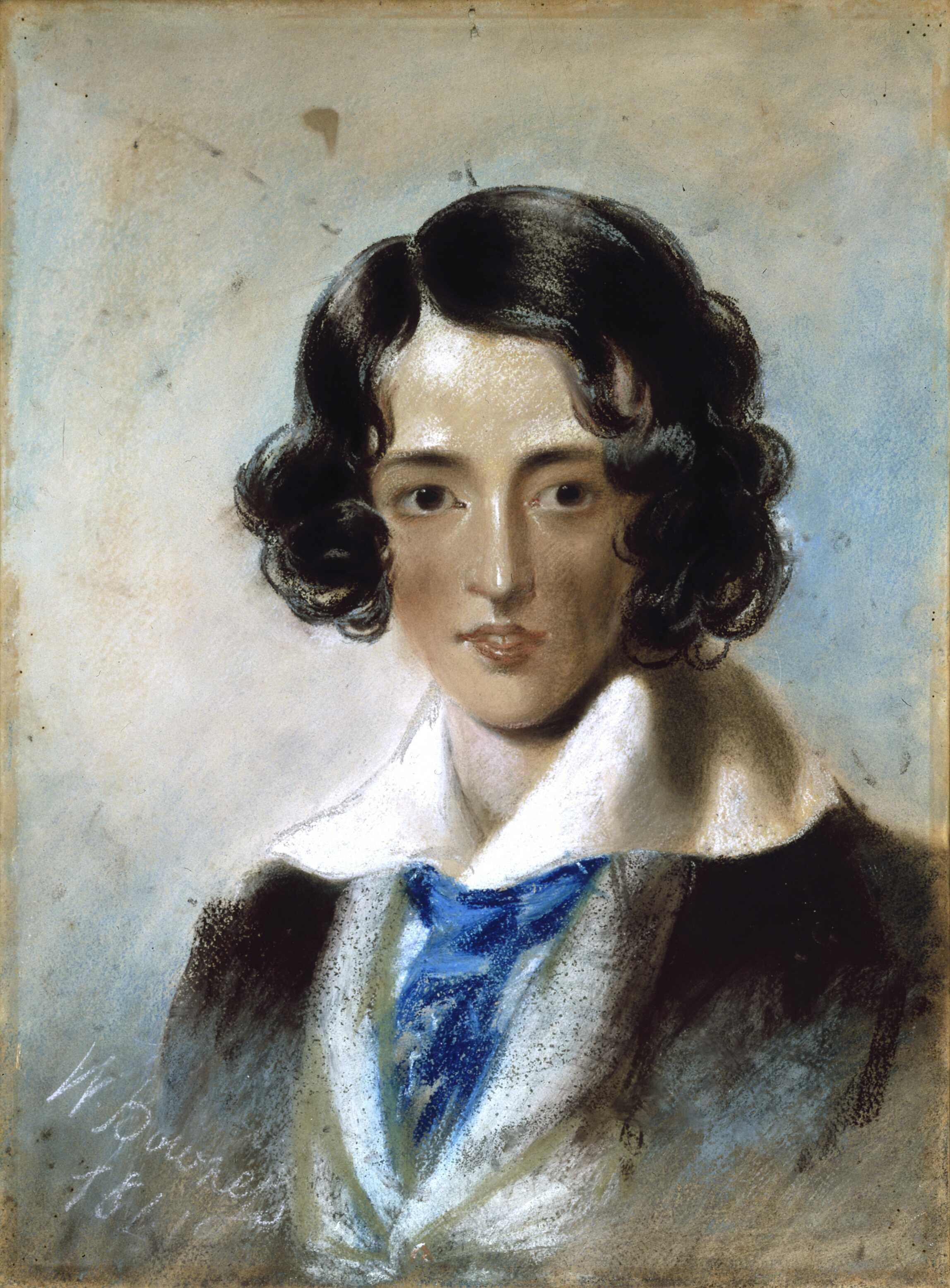
A painting of 16 year old Allom by William Bowness

Albert James Allom was born 20 December 1825 in Holloway, London. His father was founding member of the Institute of British Architects, Thomas Allom. Allom received his education at a private school near Hampstead.

== Professional career ==
=== New Zealand ===
Allom came to New Zealand aboard the Brougham as a survey cadet for the New Zealand Company, arriving 9 February 1842 in Wellington. Allom's first task was surveying land in the Manawatu, later tasks were around the Hutt Valley and Wellington and in 1844 Allom was sent off to Otago for surveying work, helping to layout the city of Dunedin. In February 1845 financial woes resulted in his post being disbanded. Allom may have designed Henry Samuel Chapman's house in Karori following his dismisall but the design was attributed to Allom's father by the Royal Academy. Allom settled in the Wairarapa and entered a partnership with another survey cadet, together the two men leased land from local Māori and established the Tauanui (Note: Near Pirinoa) cattle run.

=== Colonial Office ===
In 1848 Allom returned to England and began work as secretary for Edward Gibbon Wakefield. Allom travelled with Wakefield to Boulogne-sur-Mer and served as his amanuensis for The Art of Colonisation. Allom later assisted Wakefield with planning of the Canterbury settlement. In 1851 Allom was employed as secretary to Lieutenant-Governor of Tobago, Sir Dominick Daly and the following year Allom became Colonial Secretary. In this role he oversaw defence management in relation to the Crimean War. Before returning to England and marrying, but later returning to the West Indies to resume his post. In November 1858 Allom helped to prevent an insurrection on Tortola in the British Virgin Islands.

=== Great Barrier Island ===
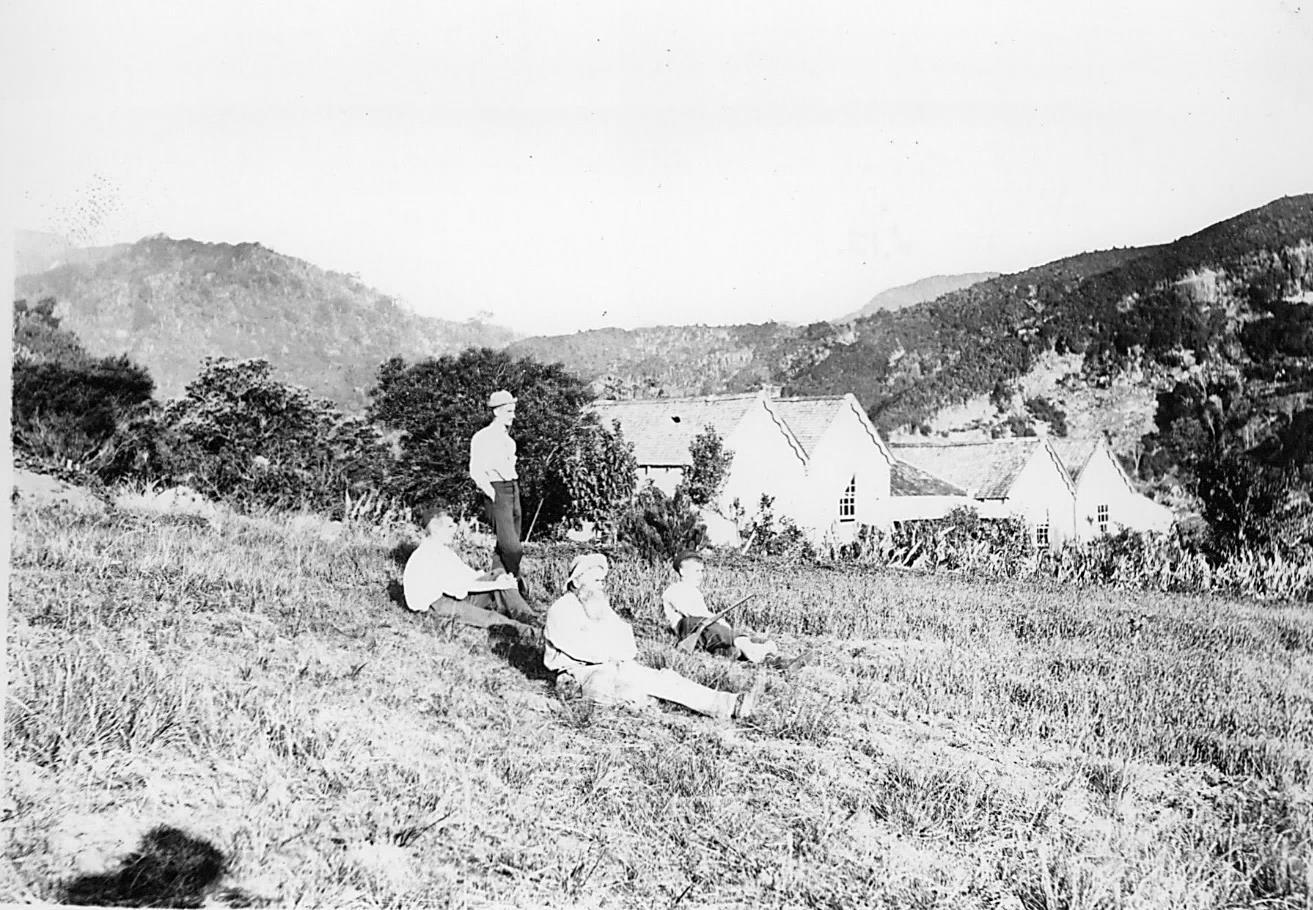
The Allom Homestead at Kaiarara Bay was built by Allom

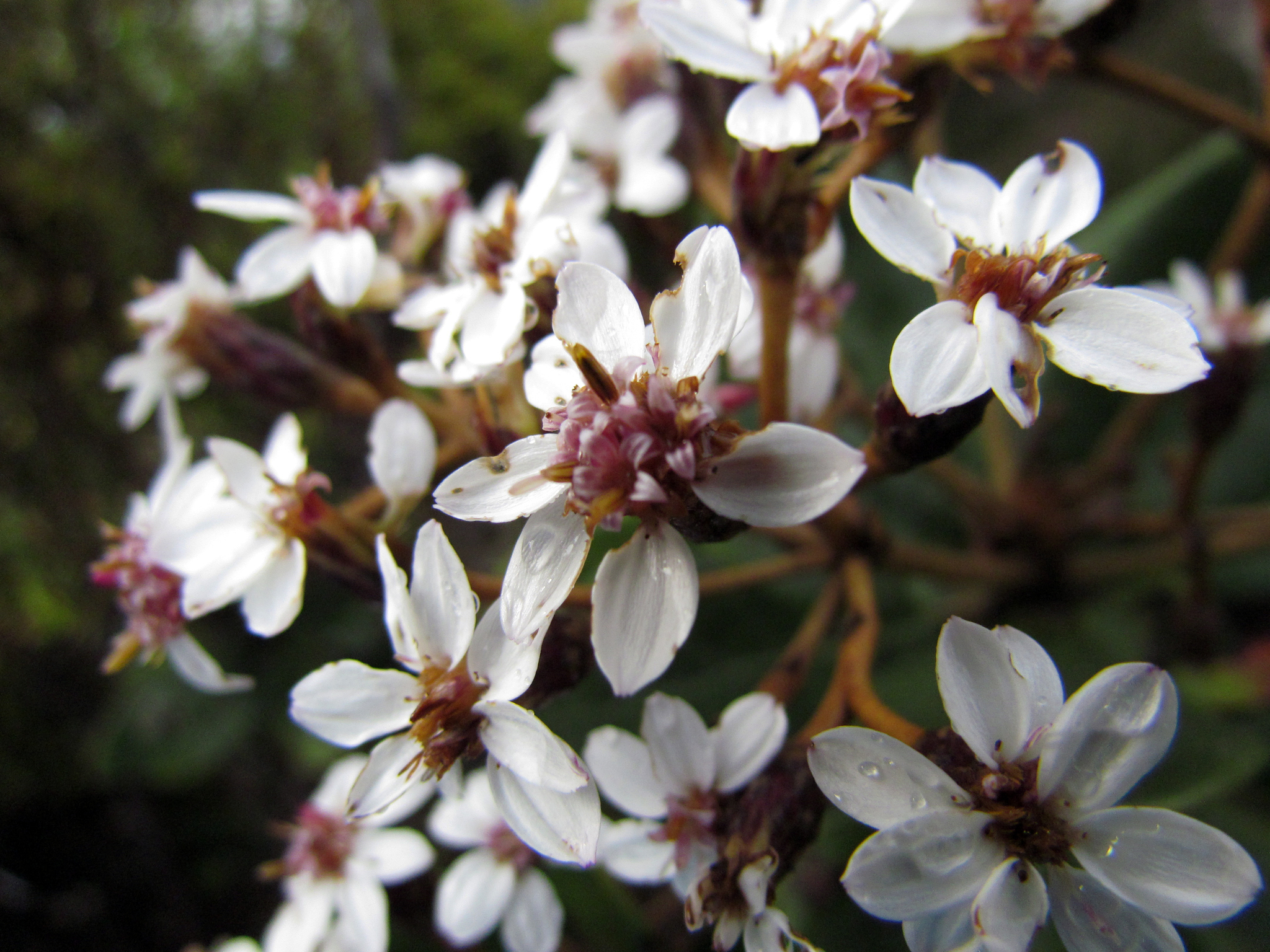
Olearia allomii is named after Allom

In 1860 Allom retired on account of his health and became manager for the Great Barrier Land, Harbour and Mining Company (GBLHMC), a role that would see him return to New Zealand. The company was responsible for milling of kauri, mining, and developing farms on Great Barrier Island, along with the establishment of Port Fitzroy as a coaling station. In December 1861 Allom arrived in Auckland with his family aboard the Mermaid. Allom built a house for himself and his family near the GBLHMC mill north of the Kaiarara Bay in 1862. On 1 July 1863 Allom became postmaster of Port Fitzroy. Three years later Allom purchased 500 acres (200 ha) of land at Okupu including Allom Bay. In November 1867, Thomas Kirk and Frederick Hutton undertook a botanical survey of Great Barrier Island, which Allom assisted with. The men discovered a new species of Olearia, it was subsequently named Olearia allomii after Allom. In 1867 Allom and his family left Great Barrier Island following the GBLHMC's liquidation.

=== Thames Goldfields ===
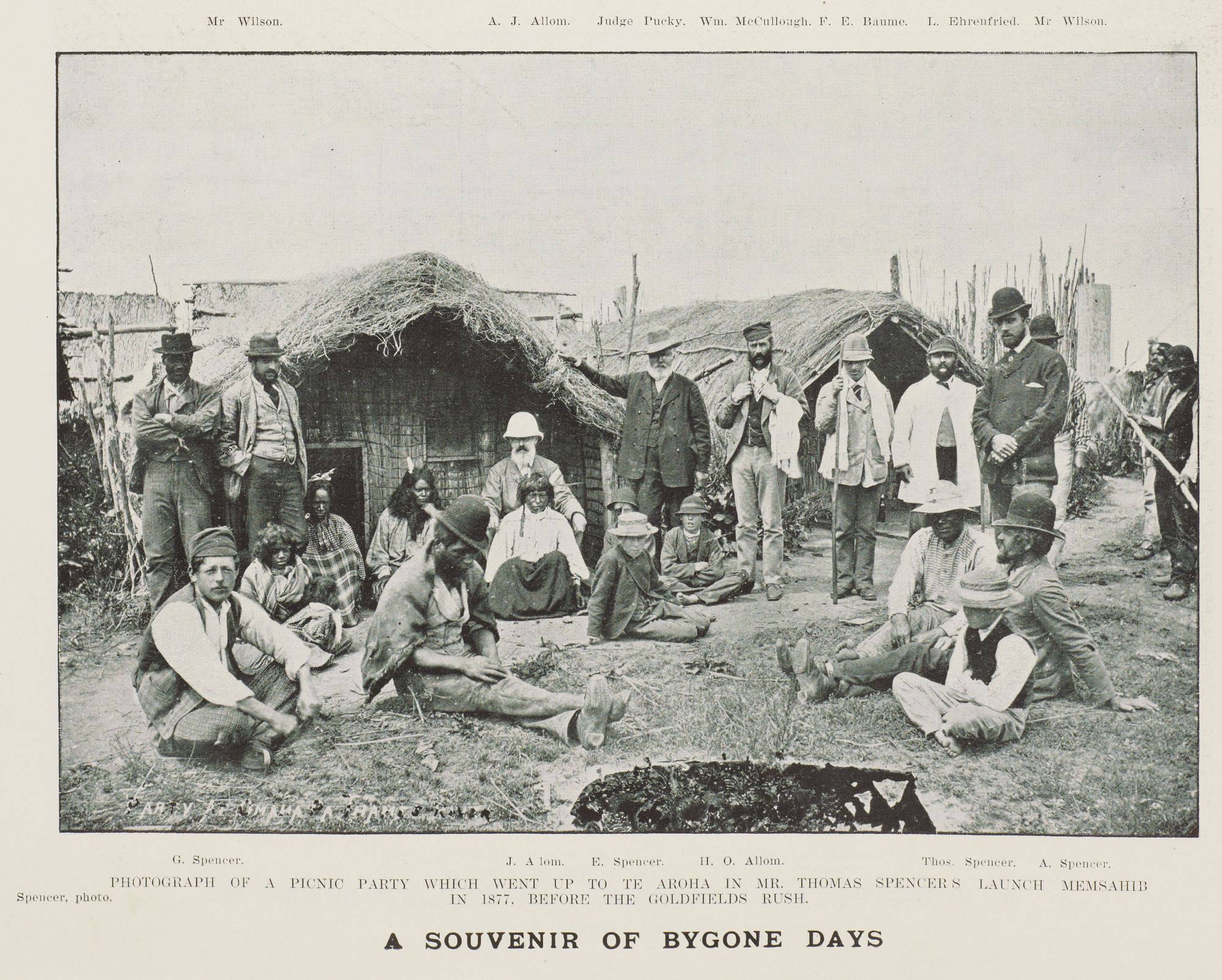
Photograph of a party that went to Te Aroha, Allom is the European man sitting down near the middle in front of the left hut.

After the collapse of his company on Great Barrier Island, Allom settled in Shortland, holding several roles in Thames for the provincial and national government and serving under the Department of Justice as a court clerk. In 1875 he was working for the Department of Mines at Mackaytown. In March 1877 the Reverend Vicesimus Lush visited Allom at Mackaytown. Lush noted in his journal that Allom was a justice of the peace and underwarden of the Thames Goldfields thus making him the most important in the town.

=== Retirement ===
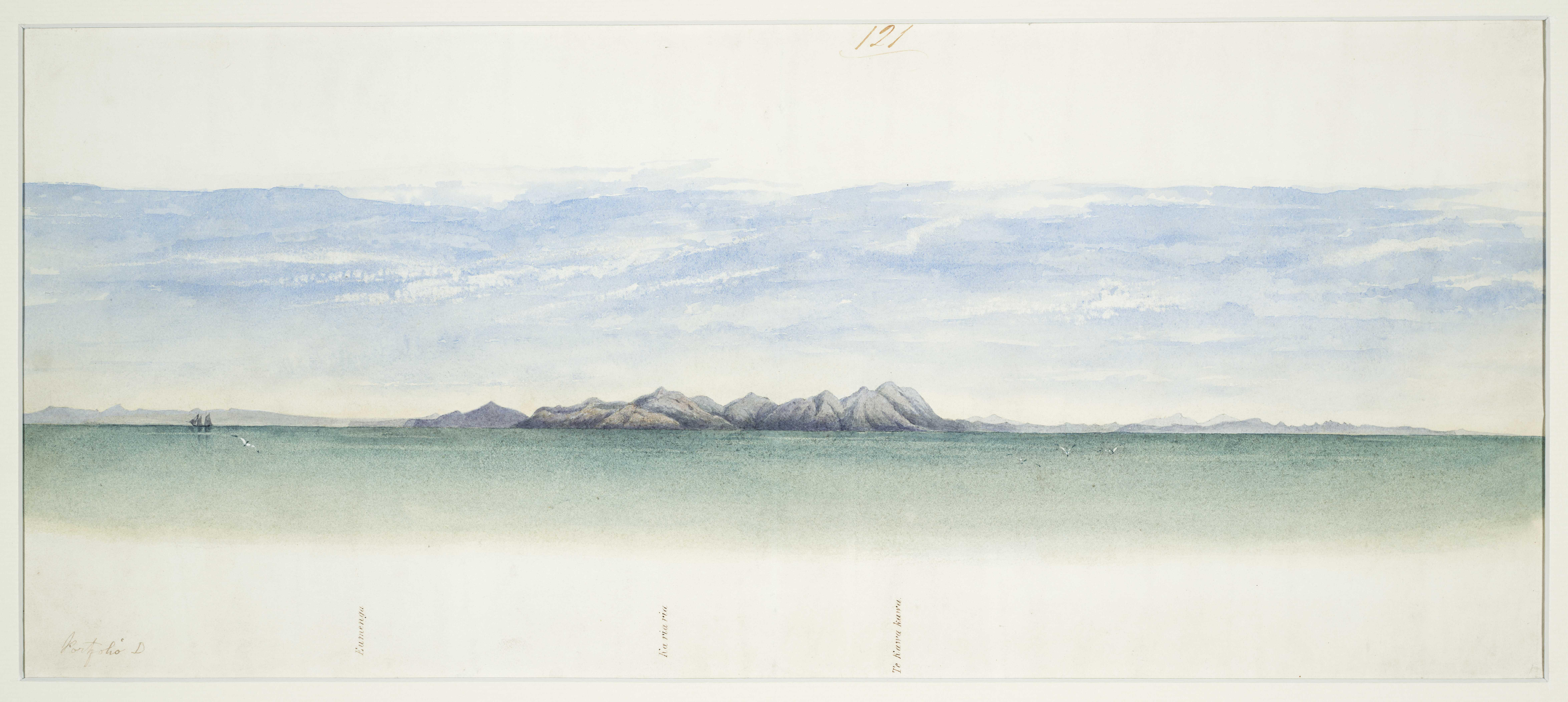
Painting of Te Araroa by Allom, c.1842–1843

In 1886 Allom retired due to an age limit. In 1889 he moved to Tasmania before moving to Auckland in 1897 and serving as honorary secretary of the Hawke's Bay Floods Relief Committee. Despite retirement Allom remained active and was involved in getting a statue of Queen Victoria erected in Albert Park and the establishment of the Auckland Scenery Conservation Society. Allom provided information for a biography of Wakefield by Richard Garnett. Allom died in Parnell 16 February 1909 and was buried at St Mark's Church, Remuera.

== Personal life ==
Allom had three children with his wife, Eliza Horn; whom he married in 1856 at Hartley Wintney, Hampshire, England.

== Legacy ==
Allom's water-colour paintings are held by the Bett Collection in Nelson.

Allom's Great Grandson, Barrie Allom, published a book about Allom titled Dear Tyrant in 2014.
