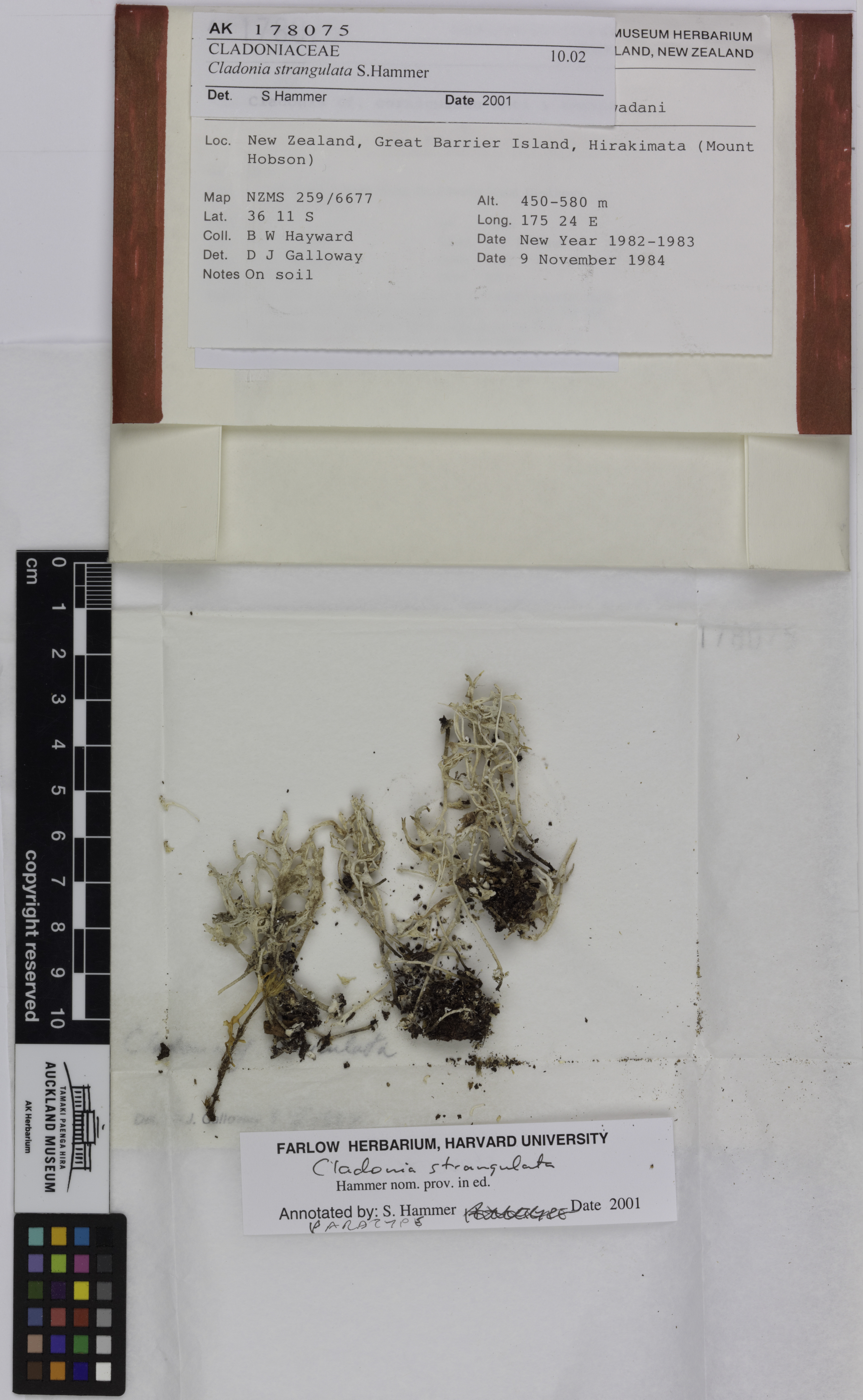
- Herbarium specimen of Cladonia strangulata

Scientific classification
- Kingdom: Fungi
- Division: Ascomycota
- Class: Lecanoromycetes
- Order: Lecanorales
- Family: Cladoniaceae
- Genus: Cladonia
- Species: C. strangulata

Binomial name
- Cladonia strangulata S.Hammer (2003)
- Holotype: Hirakimata, New Zealand

= Cladonia strangulata =

Species of lichen

Cladonia strangulata is a species of fruticose lichen in the family Cladoniaceae. Found in New Zealand, it was formally described as a new species in 2003 by the lichenologist Samuel Hammer. The type specimen was collected from Hirakimata on the Great Barrier Island, at an elevation between 450 and 580 m, where it was found growing on the soil.

The primary thallus of Cladonia strangulata is squamulose, (scaly) spatulate, and esorediate. The podetia are narrow, twisted, constricted, more or less cylindrical or flattened, corticate or sparsely sorediate, with perforated axils. They contain two secondary metabolites: atranorin and fumarprotocetraric acid. Chemical spot test results are K+ (dingy yellow turning brown) and P+ (red).

== See also ==
- List of Cladonia species
