= Mount Hobson =

Mount Hobson may refer to:

- Mount Hobson (Auckland), a volcanic cone in the Auckland Volcanic Field, New Zealand
- Mount Hobson (Great Barrier Island), the largest mountain on Great Barrier Island, New Zealand
