= Windy Canyon =

Canyon on Great Barrier Island, New Zealand

Coordinates: 36.210485°S 175.465307°E

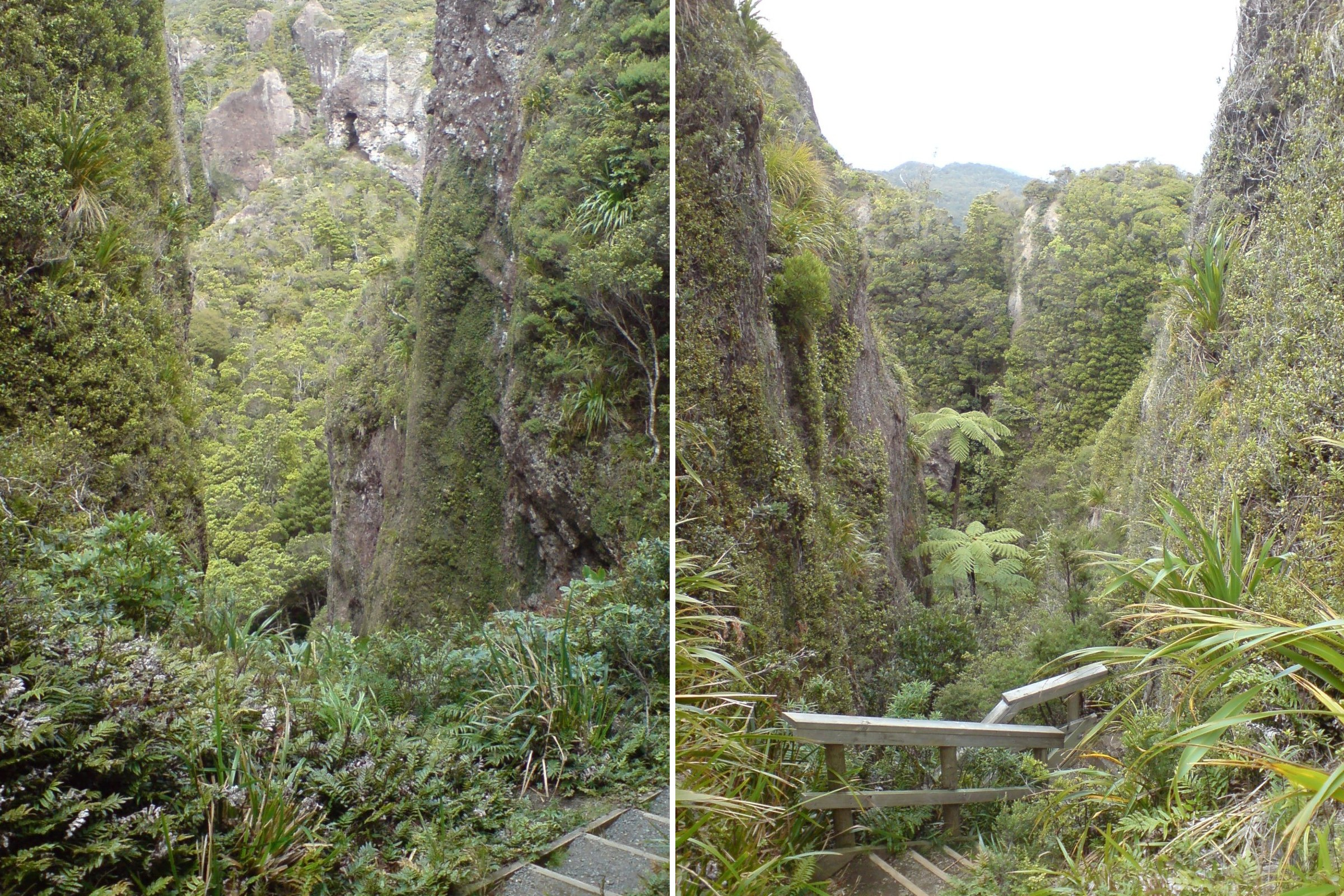
Collage of Windy Canyon

Windy Canyon is a canyon and associated walking track on Great Barrier Island, New Zealand. Located in the centre east of the island, the canyon is a wind funnel shaped from andesitic rock. The canyon is located on one of the highest stretches of the island, less than 200 m below the 621 m summit of Mount Hobson (the highest point of the island). From the canyon it is possible to view the Okiwi and Awana lowlands (north and south, respectively, of the canyon).

Palmers Track winds through the canyon, with the first part of the track (rising from the Okiwi-Claris road in the east) being boardwalked, and equipped with wooden stairs to allow access (15 minutes' walk) to the ridge. From there, the track leads further west to Mount Hobson (Hirakimatā). This part of Palmers Track is a medium-difficulty track (3–4 hours' walk return).
