= Okupu =

- Interactive map of Okupu
- Coordinates: 36.257°S 175.438°E
- Country: New Zealand
- Region: Auckland Region
- Ward: Waitematā and Gulf ward
- Local board: Aotea / Great Barrier Local Board
- Electorates: Auckland Central; Te Tai Tokerau

Government
  - Territorial Authority: Auckland Council
  - Mayor of Auckland: Wayne Brown
  - Auckland Central MP: Chlöe Swarbrick
  - Te Tai Tokerau MP: Mariameno Kapa-Kingi

Area
  - Total: 0.92 km^{2} (0.36 sq mi)

Population (June 2025)
  - Total: 120
  - Density: 130/km^{2} (340/sq mi)

Okupu is a small settlement on the southwestern side of Great Barrier Island in the Auckland Region of New Zealand. The settlement is on Okupu Bay, which is a part of Blind Bay, off Colville Channel and Hauraki Gulf.

The name comes from OKupe, meaning the place of Kupe, supposedly given to Great Barrier Island by the Polynesian explorer Kupe.

== History ==
The Sanderson family were the first European settlers at Okupu, buying 20 hectares (50 acres) in 1864 for a sheep and dairy farm. The Allom family purchased 200 hectares (500 acres) in 1866 but did not move to the land. The Ryan brothers also purchased land in the area, possibly buying some from Allom. Charles Werner was another early settler, running a store at Okupu from 1884.

Richard Smith set up a shipyard south of Blind Bay from 1867 to 1879, where he built three schooners and two cutters.

A wharf was built at Blind Bay in the 1860s to support the central part of Great Barrier. It was in use until a wharf was built in 1900 at Whangaparapara to the northwest. Okupu Wharf was replaced in the 1930s as part of a sea wall construction.

Gumdiggers operated in the area in the 1890s.

There was a post office at Okupu Bay in 1894. Two pigeon post companies competed to carry messages to Auckland from Okupu/Blind Bay from 1897 to 1908, with 800 messages carried by one company in the first two years.

Gold and silver were mined at Okupu. The Iona Mine included a tramway, stamping battery, accommodation and a school. It operated from 1901 to 1906, but was abandoned by 1908. The Sunbeam Gold and Silver Company built a stamping battery in 1906 but it stopped operations the following year as it was not profitable. Ngatiawa Gold Mining Company built a tramway, water race and battery for its own mine, but that closed in 1908.

A school opened in the 1920s for the children of the Sanderson family. It shared a teacher with the Tryphena school.

A fish packing plant opened at Blind Bay by Bill Owen in the 1960s and was sold to Halma Holdings in the 1970s. It later closed.

== Demographics ==
Statistics New Zealand describes Okupu as a rural settlement, which covers 0.92 km^{2} (0.36 sq mi) and had an estimated population of 120 as of June 2025, with a population density of 130 people per km^{2}. Okupu is part of the larger Barrier Islands statistical area.

Historical population
Year	Pop.	±% p.a.
2013	66	—
2018	105	+9.73%
2023	117	+2.19%

Okupu had a population of 117 in the 2023 New Zealand census, an increase of 12 people (11.4%) since the 2018 census, and an increase of 51 people (77.3%) since the 2013 census. There were 57 males and 57 females in 63 dwellings. 5.1% of people identified as LGBTIQ+. The median age was 49.5 years (compared with 38.1 years nationally). There were 12 people (10.3%) aged under 15 years, 21 (17.9%) aged 15 to 29, 60 (51.3%) aged 30 to 64, and 21 (17.9%) aged 65 or older.

People could identify as more than one ethnicity. The results were 92.3% European (Pākehā), 30.8% Māori, 2.6% Pasifika, and 2.6% Asian. English was spoken by 100.0%, Māori language by 5.1%, and other languages by 5.1%. The percentage of people born overseas was 17.9, compared with 28.8% nationally.

Religious affiliations were 17.9% Christian, and 2.6% Māori religious beliefs. People who answered that they had no religion were 66.7%, and 10.3% of people did not answer the census question.

Of those at least 15 years old, 15 (14.3%) people had a bachelor's or higher degree, 63 (60.0%) had a post-high school certificate or diploma, and 21 (20.0%) people exclusively held high school qualifications. The median income was $27,100, compared with $41,500 nationally. 6 people (5.7%) earned over $100,000 compared to 12.1% nationally. The employment status of those at least 15 was that 45 (42.9%) people were employed full-time, 18 (17.1%) were part-time, and 6 (5.7%) were unemployed.

== Sources ==
- Walker, Megan; Brassey, Robert (May 2019), Historic Heritage Survey Aotea Great Barrier Island (PDF)
- Walker, Megan; Brassey, Robert (May 2019a), "Appendix 1 - Historic Context Statement", Historic Heritage Survey Aotea Great Barrier Island (PDF)
