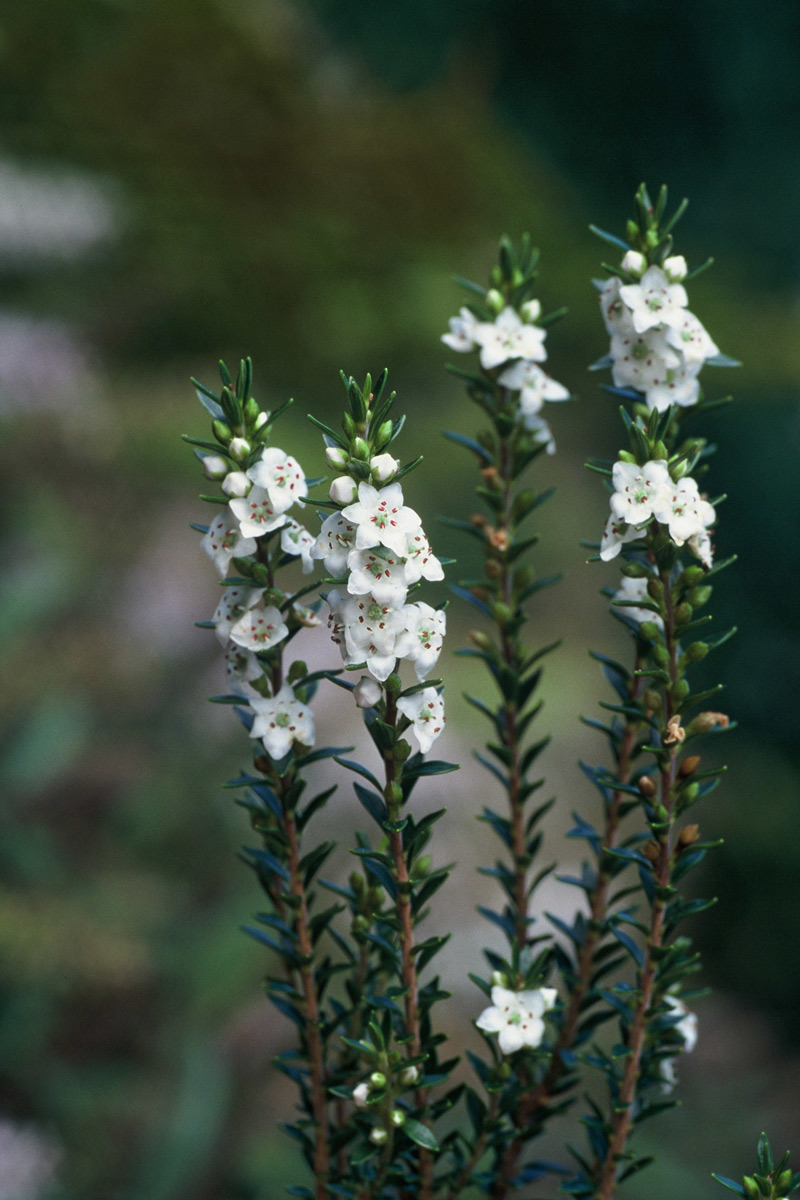

Conservation status
- Naturally Uncommon (NZ TCS)

Scientific classification
- Kingdom: Plantae
- Clade: Tracheophytes
- Clade: Angiosperms
- Clade: Eudicots
- Clade: Asterids
- Order: Ericales
- Family: Ericaceae
- Genus: Epacris
- Species: E. sinclairii

Binomial name
- Epacris sinclairii Hook.f.

Synonyms
- Epacris pauciflora var. sinclairii (Hook.f.) Cheeseman

= Epacris sinclairii =

Species of plant

Epacris sinclairii, also known as Sinclair's tamingi, is a plant species in the family Ericaceae. The species is endemic to New Zealand, found exclusively on Great Barrier Island and the Coromandel Peninsula.

== Taxonomy ==
The plant was first described as Epacris sinclairii in 1864 by Joseph Dalton Hooker, based on specimens collected by Andrew Sinclair. Hooker named the species after Sinclair.

In the 1906 Manual of the New Zealand flora, Thomas Cheeseman described Sinclair's tamingi as Epacris pauciflora var. sinclairii, This was the preferred nomenclature until 2002, when Peter de Lange and Brian Grant Murray argued that Sinclair's tamingi should be recognised as a species due to morphological differences, growth pattern differences, that E. pauciflora and E. sinclairii are occasionally sympatric, and their differing preferred habitats.

Genetic analysis indicates that E. sinclairii is closely related to E. pauciflora.

== Description ==
Hooker's original text (the type description) reads as follows:

A foot high, much branched; branches stout, puberulous, leafy. Leaves erect, imbricating, ⅙-¼ in. long, densely coriaceous, narrow lanceolate-oblong or oblong, obtuse, smooth and glabrous on both surfaces. Bracts, calyx, etc., as in E. pauciflora.

E. sinclairii is a woody shrub that has small, hard leaves with the widest section in the middle. The undersides of the leaves have three dark green lines, and paler green tips. The species' flowers are typically white, but may be red or pink. The species can be differentiated from the closely related species E. pauciflora due E. pauciflora having a more open, heavily branched upright growth habit, E. sinclairii having larger bright olive green leaves, E. pauciflora having leaves that narrow into tapered points, and differences in preferred habitats (E. pauciflora typically being found in scrub and peat bogs, while E. sinclairii lives in rock outcrops and in higher altitude forest, occasionally as an epiphyte).

E. sinclairii can grow as a shrub or as a small tree, reaching a maximum height of 9 m (30 ft) (but typically much smaller). The leaves measure between 5–15 mm (0.20–0.59 in) long.

== Ecology ==
The species typically flowers in April, and fruits between May and July.

== Distribution and habitat ==
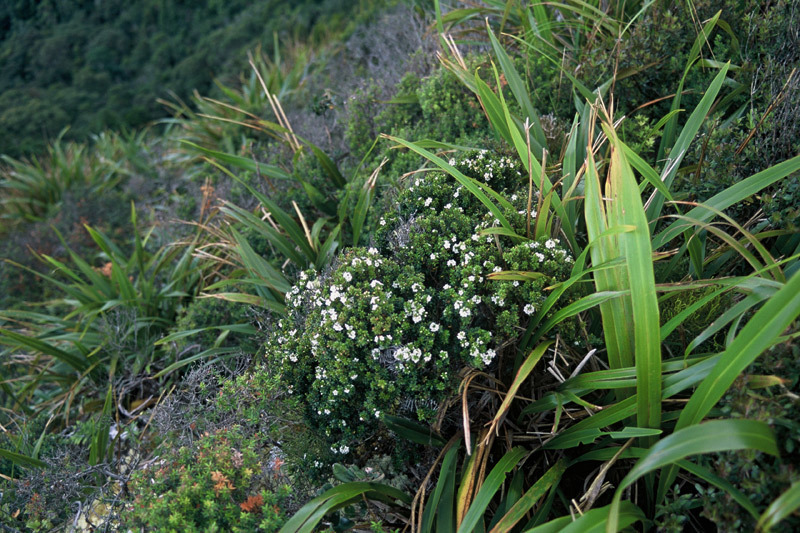
Epacris sinclairii growing in a rocky high elevation area of Great Barrier Island

The species is endemic to New Zealand, known from two locations: the Mount Hobson massif of central Great Barrier Island, and the Upper Kauaeranga Valley of the Coromandel Peninsula. E. sinclairii grows exclusively in rhyolitic soil, typically found in high elevation humid forest and surrounding areas, and can occasionally be an epiphyte.

E. sinclairii often grows in kauri-dominated forests. Historic kauri logging in New Zealand may be a reason for the species' restricted range.
