= Whangaparapara =

Coordinates: 36.2427°S 175.3984°E

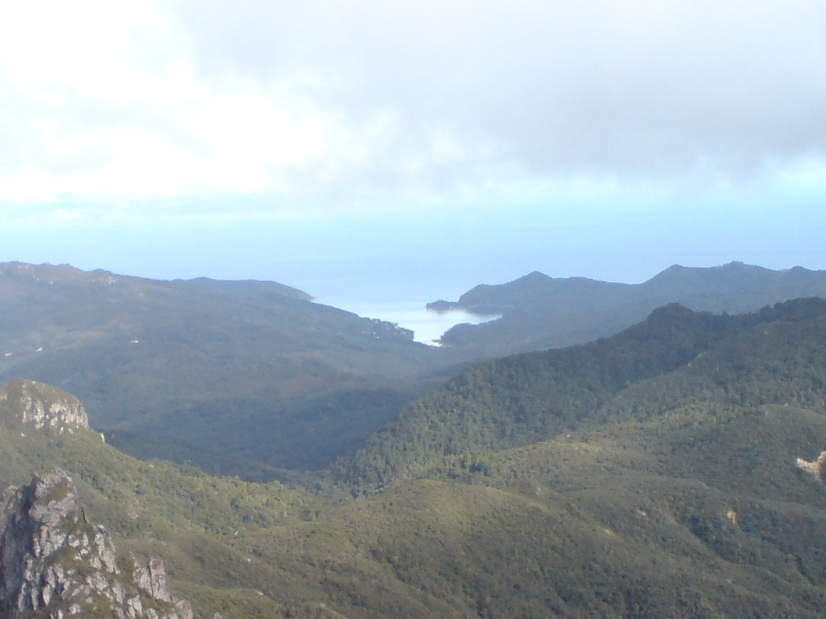
Whangaparapara Harbour seen from Mount Hobson

Whangaparapara is a harbour and coastal community on Great Barrier Island in New Zealand's Hauraki Gulf.

Europeans settled Whangaparapara for mining, timber milling and whaling. It is now a tourism and boating spot, where boats can pick up fuel and water.

== History ==
European settlers felled native forests, establishing tramlines to extract the timber to the harbour where it was transported to Auckland for milling. The tramline is now part of a heritage trek.

Gold and silver were discovered in the area in the late 19th century. The Oreville stamping ore-crushing battery is still visible from the road.

The Kauri Timber Company sawmill was established in the early 20th century, to process logs from the Coromandel Peninsula and Northland Region. For a while it was the largest mill in the southern hemisphere.

New Zealand's last whaling station operated on the northern side of the Whangaparapara Harbour from 1957 to 1962. It is also still visible.

The anchor of the SS Wiltshire, which wrecked in the area in 1922, is still visible at a local lodge.

The 2010s, the Department of Conservation permanently closed the Mount Whangaparapara walking track due to the risk of Kauri dieback.
