= Aiguilles Island =

Island in New Zealand

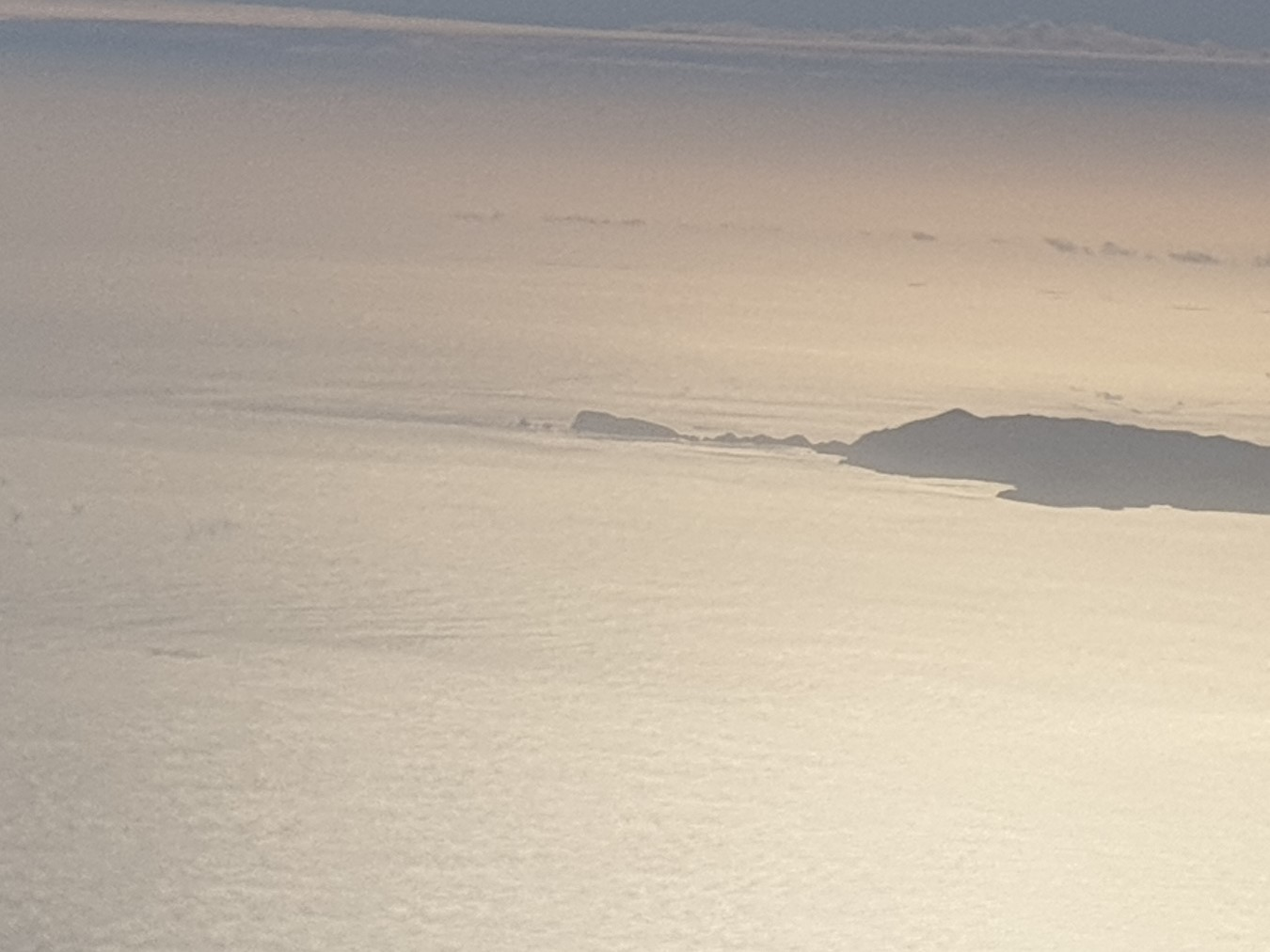
- Aiguilles Island off the northern coast of Great Barrier Island

Geography
- Coordinates: 36°02′0″S 175°24′30″E
- Highest elevation: 120 m (390 ft)

Administration
- New Zealand

Demographics
- Population: 0

Aiguilles Island is an uninhabited island just northeast of Great Barrier Island in the Auckland Region of New Zealand. The island reaches a height of 120 metres (394 ft) and is 47 kilometres (29 mi) from the New Zealand mainland.

== See also ==
- List of islands of New Zealand
- List of islands
- Desert island
