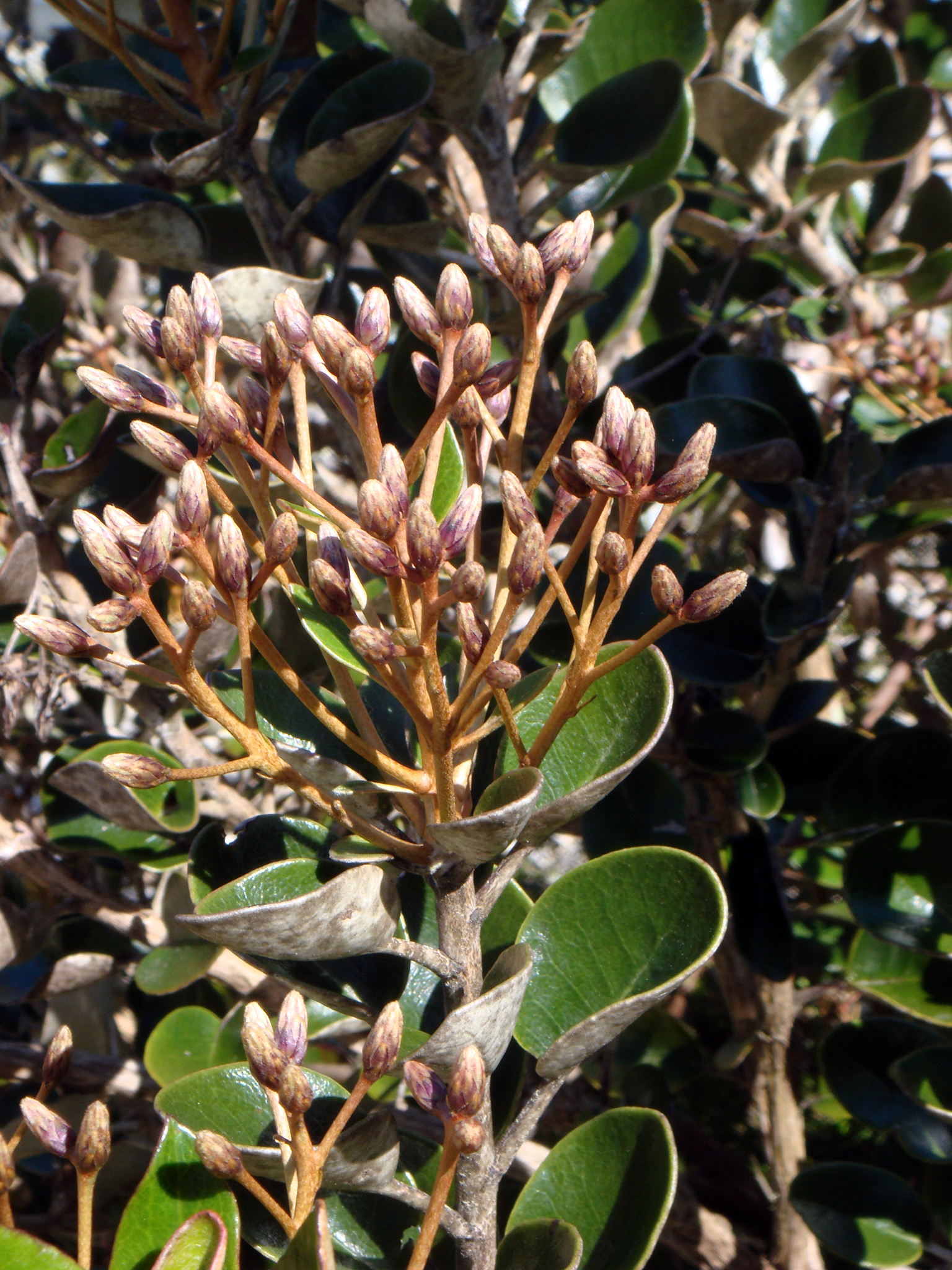

Conservation status
- Naturally Uncommon (NZ TCS)

Scientific classification
- Kingdom: Plantae
- Clade: Tracheophytes
- Clade: Angiosperms
- Clade: Eudicots
- Clade: Asterids
- Order: Asterales
- Family: Asteraceae
- Genus: Olearia
- Species: O. allomii

Binomial name
- Olearia allomii Kirk
- Known native range

= Olearia allomii =

Species of plant

Olearia allomii, also known as the Great Barrier tree daisy, is a species of flowering plant in the family Asteraceae. The plant was first described by Thomas Kirk in 1871, and is endemic to Great Barrier Island and nearby Hauraki Gulf islands in the Auckland Region, New Zealand.

== Taxonomy ==
The species was formally described by Thomas Kirk in 1871, and was discovered at Mount Young on Great Barrier Island in November 1867 by Kirk, Albert James Allom and Frederick Hutton. Kirk named the species after Allom.

== Description ==
Kirk's original text (the type description) reads as follows:

A low shrub, varying from a few inches to two feet in height, branching from the base, branches few, stout. Leaves oblong, unequal at the base, excessively thick and coriaceous, obtuse, shining, reticulate above, principal veins diverging from the mid-rib nearly at right angles, mid-rib prominent below, often giving the leaf a keeled appearance, leaf covered below with densely appressed, silvery, shining, tomentum, l"-2" long, rather closely set; petioles short, stout; corymbs longer than the leaves, pecluncled, downy, spreading, lax, many-headed, simple or slightly branched. Heads on stout downy pedicels ¼"-¾ long, large, broad; involuere cylindrical; scales numerous, imbricate, broadly lanceolate, obtuse, puberulous or downy; florets 6-8; rays about 8, broad, notched at the apex, white; pappus brown spreading, feathered. Achenes downy.

O. allomii has broad dish-shaped leathery leaves with white undersides, which measure 2.5–5 cm (0.98–1.97 in) by 2–4 cm (0.79–1.57 in). The species has fuzzy white twigs, a thick stalk, and typically has large clusters of white flowers.

Kirk noted similarities to the species Olearia haastii, but could identify O. allomii due to the larger size of its parts, dwarf rigid habit, and loose scales.

The species flowers between September and December, and fruits between October and April.

== Distribution and habitat ==
The species is endemic to Great Barrier Island and the surrounding islands of the Hauraki Gulf, New Zealand. In 2009, the species was confirmed to be present on Kaikōura Island. O. allomii is one of the few plants endemic to the Auckland Region.

O. allomii typically grows on cliffs, rock outcrops or open shrubland, typical of the central area of Great Barrier Island.

== Gallery ==
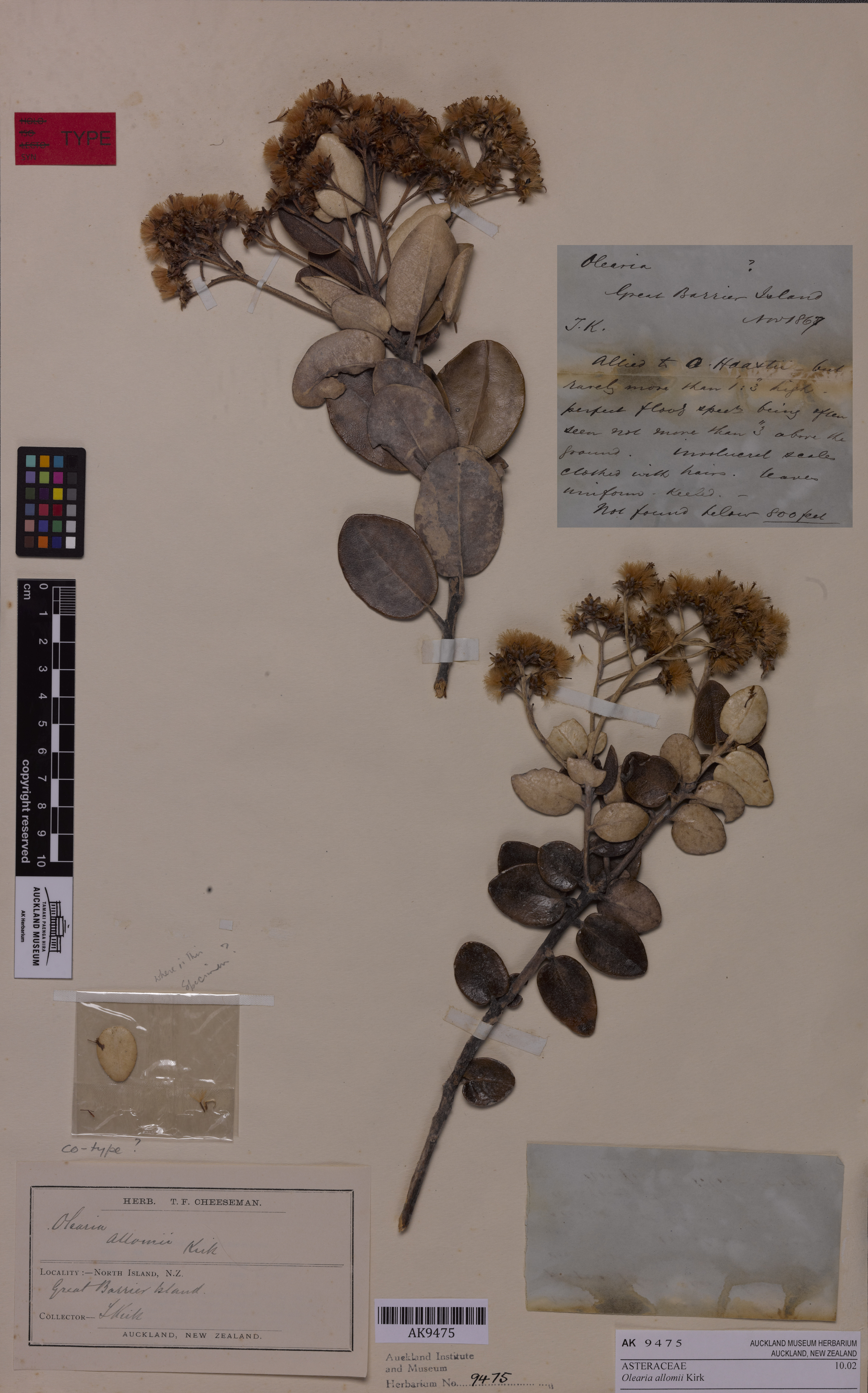
Syntype from the herbarium of the Auckland War Memorial Museum

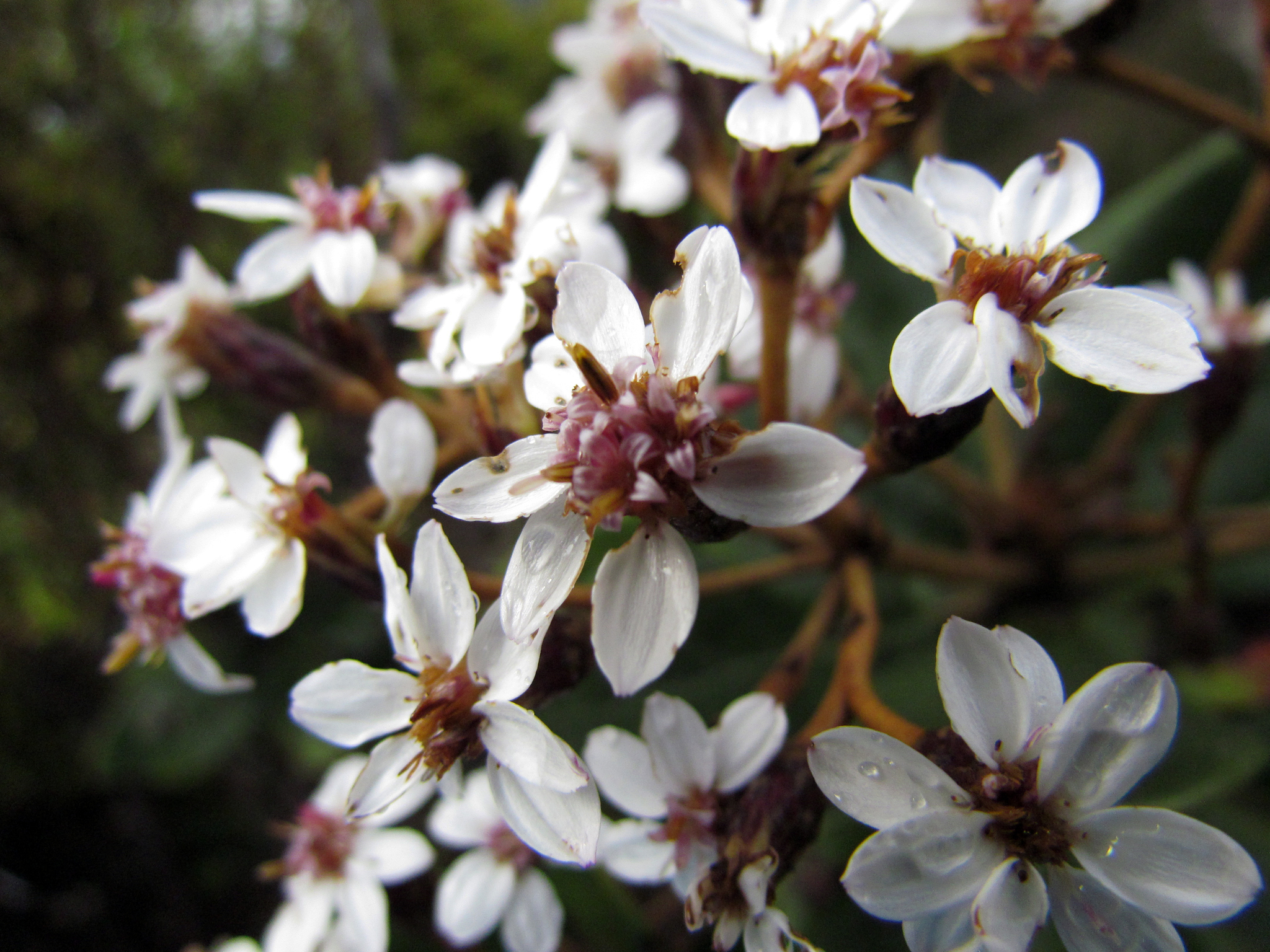
Flowers of O. allomii

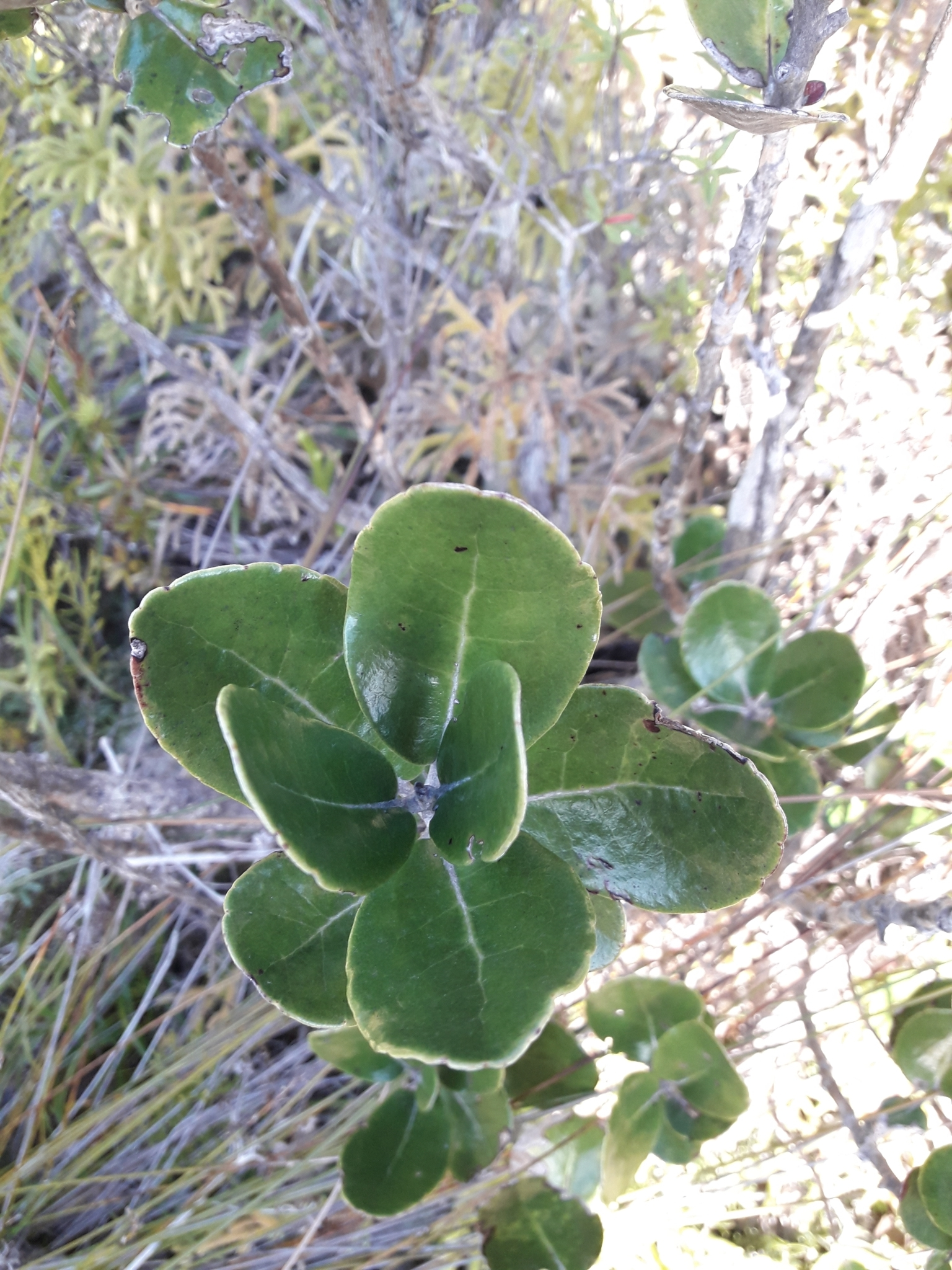
Leaves of O. allomii

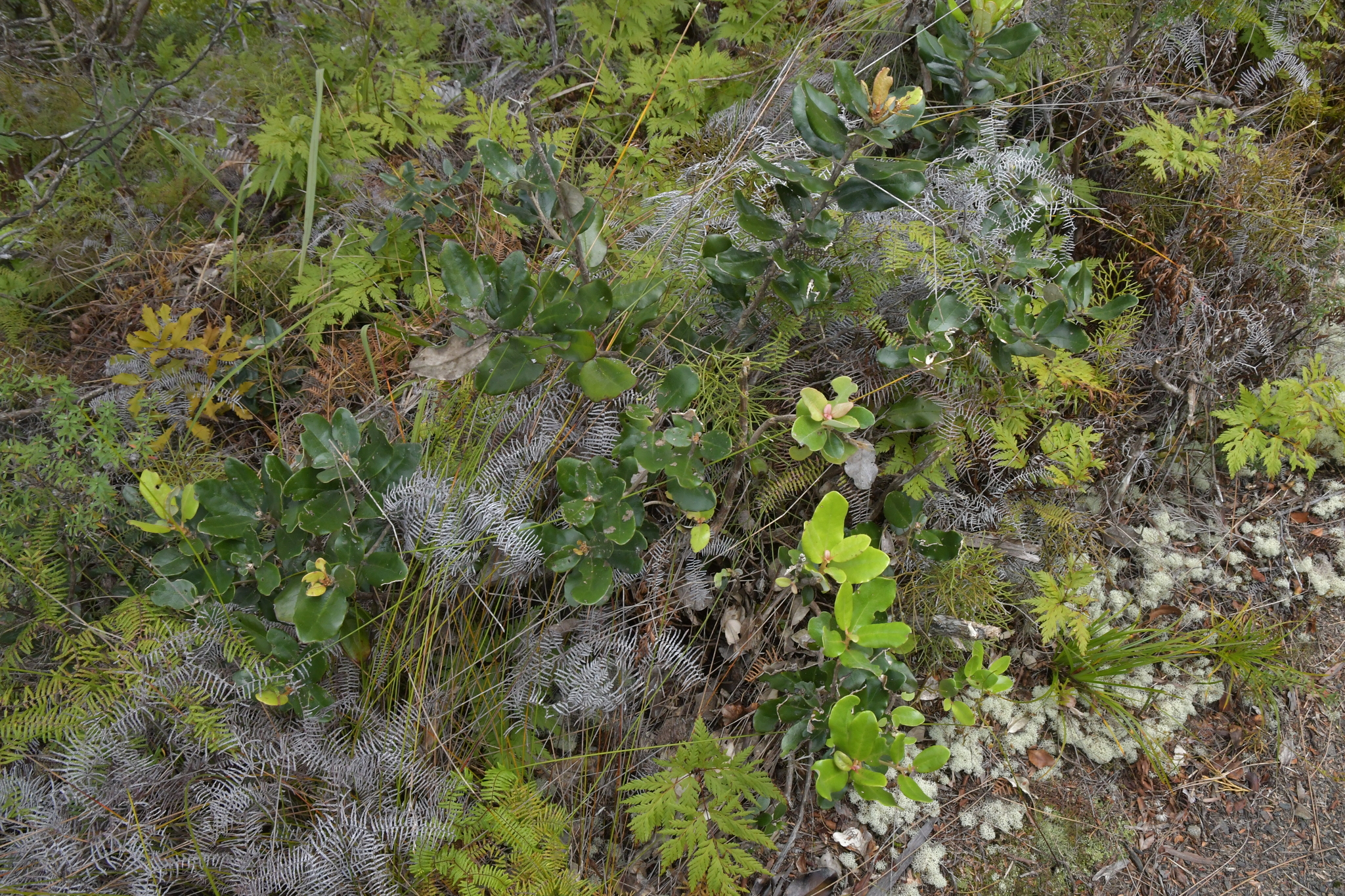
O. allomii growing in its typical rocky habitat
