= Paul Silva (woodchopper) =

New Zealand soldier, timber worker, axeman, and bridge builder

Paul Thomas Silva (1897–1974) was a notable New Zealand soldier, timber worker, axeman and bridge builder. He was born in Great Barrier Island, Auckland, New Zealand in 1897. His father was Domingo Silva, a Brazilian of African descent, who arrived in New Zealand in about 1867. John da Silva, an Olympic wrestler, was his nephew.
