= Tryphena, New Zealand =

Tryphena
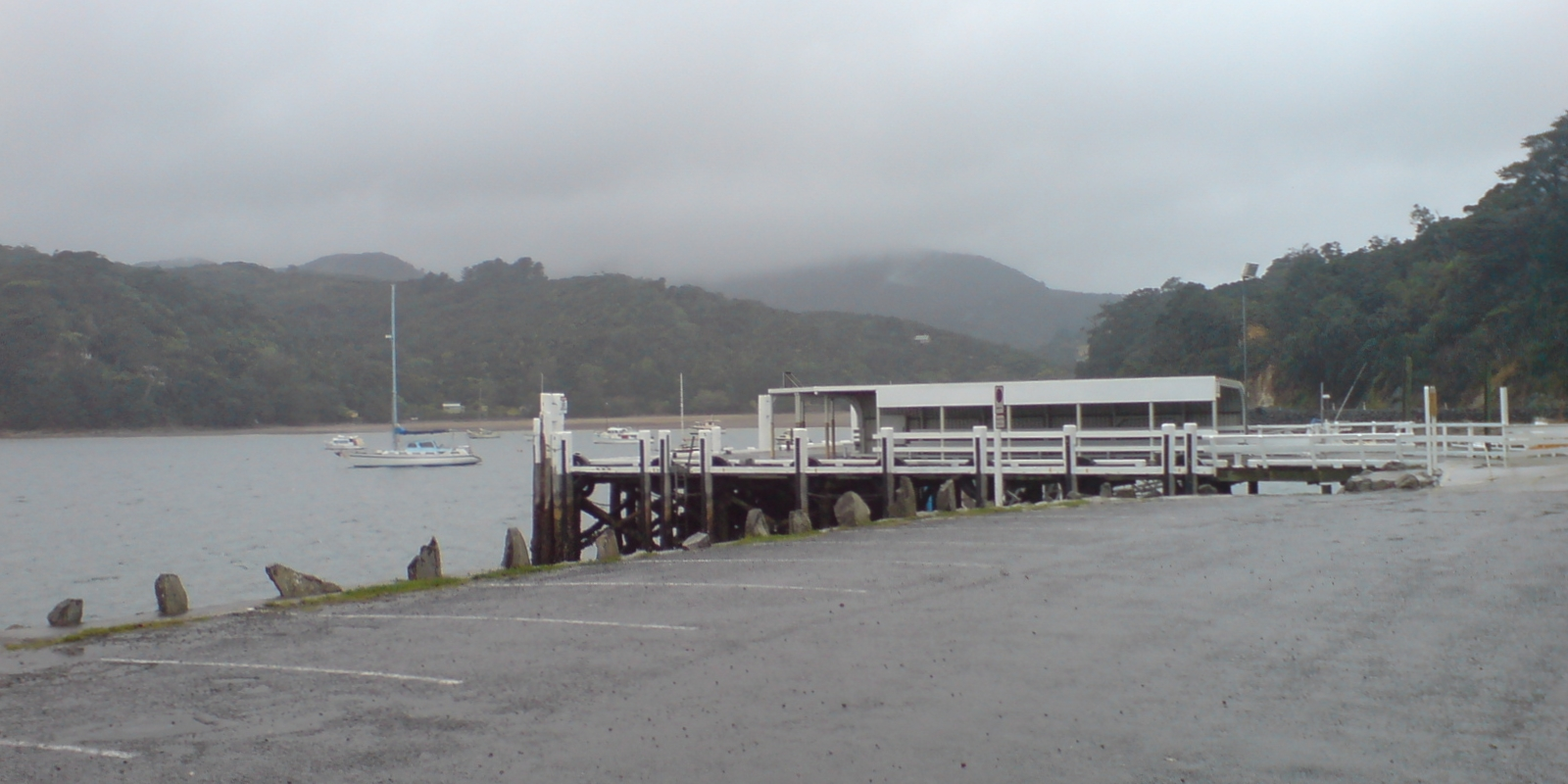
- Tryphena Ferry Terminal
- Interactive map of Tryphena
- Coordinates: 36.3010°S 175.4860°E
- Country: New Zealand
- Region: Auckland Region
- Ward: Waitematā and Gulf ward
- Local board: Aotea / Great Barrier Local Board
- Electorates: Auckland Central; Te Tai Tokerau

Government
  - Territorial Authority: Auckland Council
  - Mayor of Auckland: Wayne Brown
  - Auckland Central MP: Chlöe Swarbrick
  - Te Tai Tokerau MP: Mariameno Kapa-Kingi

Area
  - Total: 3.75 km^{2} (1.45 sq mi)

Population (June 2025)
  - Total: 200
  - Density: 53/km^{2} (140/sq mi)

Tryphena is a beach settlement on the southern coast of Great Barrier Island in the Hauraki Gulf of New Zealand's Auckland Region.

The township has a walkway, shops and public facilities. It was one of the only areas in Great Barrier Island with good mobile and internet connectivity.

SeaLink New Zealand operates a 4.5 hour car ferry between Tryphena and Wynyard Quarter. The Tryphena wharf has a shelter, wheelchair toilet and limited short-term parking. There is no terminal, ticket office, long-term parking or public transport.

The area is a habitat for New Zealand kaka, kererū, rails, pateke, blue penguins, dolphins and orcas.

The area is used for kayaking, paddleboarding, fishing, boating and swimming.

== History ==
The bay was traditionally the site of a pā (fortified settlement) of Ngāti Rehua Ngati Wai ki Aotea.

During the 19th century, early European settlers arrived in the bay, calling it Port Tofino.

The settlement was renamed Tryphena, after a brig of the same name made several visits to Great Barrier Island between 1841 and 1845.

Tryphena House was built in front of the original Tryphena wharf in 1923, using the remnants of a shipwreck in the bay. The building is now used for accommodation.

In May 2020, members of Ngāti Rehua Ngati Wai ki Aotea attempted to establish a checkpoint at the Tryphena Wharf, to prevent people from visiting the island during the COVID-19 pandemic in New Zealand.

== Demographics ==
Statistics New Zealand describes Tryphena as a rural settlement, which covers 3.75 km^{2} (1.45 sq mi) and had an estimated population of 200 as of June 2025, with a population density of 53 people per km^{2}. Tryphena is part of the larger Barrier Islands statistical area.

Historical population
Year	Pop.	±% p.a.
2006	144	—
2013	177	+2.99%
2018	201	+2.58%
2023	198	−0.30%

Tryphena had a population of 198 in the 2023 New Zealand census, a decrease of 3 people (−1.5%) since the 2018 census, and an increase of 21 people (11.9%) since the 2013 census. There were 105 males, 96 females and 3 people of other genders in 108 dwellings. 3.0% of people identified as LGBTIQ+. The median age was 51.4 years (compared with 38.1 years nationally). There were 27 people (13.6%) aged under 15 years, 18 (9.1%) aged 15 to 29, 96 (48.5%) aged 30 to 64, and 54 (27.3%) aged 65 or older.

People could identify as more than one ethnicity. The results were 84.8% European (Pākehā), 27.3% Māori, 1.5% Pasifika, 4.5% Asian, and 6.1% other, which includes people giving their ethnicity as "New Zealander". English was spoken by 97.0%, Māori language by 6.1%, and other languages by 10.6%. No language could be spoken by 1.5% (e.g. too young to talk). The percentage of people born overseas was 18.2, compared with 28.8% nationally.

Religious affiliations were 18.2% Christian, 1.5% Māori religious beliefs, 3.0% New Age, and 1.5% other religions. People who answered that they had no religion were 69.7%, and 9.1% of people did not answer the census question.

Of those at least 15 years old, 18 (10.5%) people had a bachelor's or higher degree, 96 (56.1%) had a post-high school certificate or diploma, and 54 (31.6%) people exclusively held high school qualifications. The median income was $27,500, compared with $41,500 nationally. 12 people (7.0%) earned over $100,000 compared to 12.1% nationally. The employment status of those at least 15 was that 69 (40.4%) people were employed full-time, 27 (15.8%) were part-time, and 3 (1.8%) were unemployed.

== Education ==
Mulberry Grove School is a coeducational full primary (years 1–8) school with a roll of 24 students as of July 2026. The school was established in 1962. Tryphena School operated from 1884 to 1939, when it closed because the roll was very low.
