= William Bowness =

English painter

William Bowness (1809 – 1867) was an English artist and poet. He was an exhibitor in the Suffolk Street Gallery and at the Royal Academy from 1841 to 1855, sending portraits and occasionally figure subjects. He died in 1867.

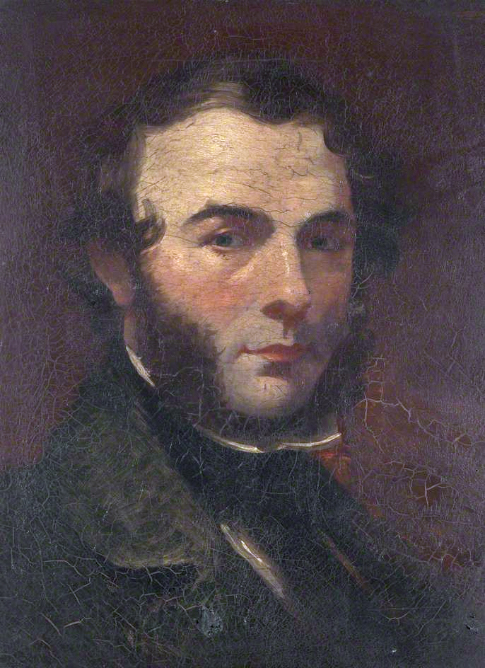
Self-portrait by William Bowness

== Life ==
Bowness was born in Highgate, Kendal, Westmorland in 1809, the son of Richard Bowness, a hosier, and Jane Knipe. His parents were Inghamites belonging to the Pear Tree Chapel, which was an early version of the Methodists. His father died young and his mother took over the business to provide for her young children, William and his four sisters.

William showed an early aptitude for drawing and his mother, following advice, placed him with the drawing school recently opened by S. Crosthwaite in the Market Place house recently occupied by Mrs Jackson Harrison.

His studies were interrupted when he was about 15 years old, as his mother died and he took over responsibility for providing for, and educating his sisters, continuing the hosiery business and trying to sort out his father's affairs.

The compiler of his long obituary in the Westmorland Gazette on 11 January 1868 remembers his loving care of the orphaned family and his continuous study of drawing. The obituary also speaks of Bowness's athletic agility and of his feats of daring when he climbed the donjon tower of the then much higher Kendal Castle, and, running round the top leapt the terrific gorge to the consternation and admiration of the large crowd. He later went on to attract admiration in London for his skating performances on the Serpentine river in Hyde Park, eclipsing the best men in the Skating Club.

By the time his sisters had grown up. William, who had been exhibiting his work, was still hankering after a painting career, and this ambition was "hastened after an introduction to Thomas Allom, the estimable landscape painter and architect, and to Mr Thomas Sidney Cooper A.R.A whom he met at the home of Mr. John Barton, then of Gill Cottage, (now of Preston)". He set off to try his fortune in London.

He did not follow his friends’ advice and stick to vignette heads in crayons, wanting to use paints, and unfortunately he did not become fashionable. After some tribulations he settled on becoming a provincial artist, and being of a genial and affable nature, and excelling in poetry, vocal, and instrumental music, he made friends and patrons in Lancashire, Yorkshire, Staffordshire, Nottinghamshire and Westmorland who were glad to give him work in oils.

== Poetry ==
William must have found that his poetry was well received and intended to publish because he had written the Introduction in London in 1867 just before his death. The book was published in Kendal by his friends the next year under the title Rustic Studies in the Westmorland Dialect, with Sketches from the Sketch Book of an Artist (published by Whittaker and Company in London, printed by Titus Wilson, Kendal).

=== Introduction ===
My book was never meant to plough the main,
In search of conquest, or in quest of gain;
Content to coast along a friendly shore,
Securely sheltered if the sky should low’r:
Too small to hoist a sail, a simple oar
Propels my skiff – to carry one- no more!
Ye critics, therefore, let it smoothly glide,
Nor raise the show’r, nor ruffle ye the tide,
For if ye do but either, - aye, or frown,
Your sink my craft – it instantly goes down!

== Known paintings ==
=== Pictures in the Kendal Town Hall Collection ===
- Samuel Gawith, Mayor of Kendal 1864–5
- Samuel Whineray, Mayor of Kendal 1845–6 1848–9
- William Geldard, Mayor of Kendal 1837–8 (painted in 1836)
- John Hudson, Mayor of Kendal 1852–3
- Cornelius Nicholson, Mayor of Kendal 1845–8, author of Annals of Kendal
- John Wakefield Esq., High Sheriff of Westmorland 1853
- Thompson Bindloss, Mayor of Kendal 1838–9 1844–5
- Thomas Gough Esq., surgeon of Kendal 1805–80
- William Bowness, self-portrait
- Mrs Braithwite of Greenside
- John Gasgarth 1770–1839
- William Bowness (another self-portrait)
- Major Whitwell
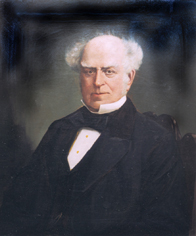
:Cornelius Nicholson

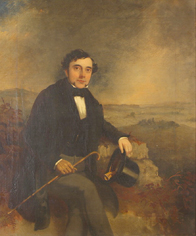
:John Hudson

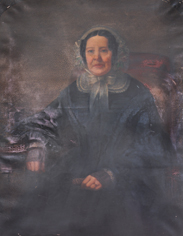
:Mrs Braithwaite

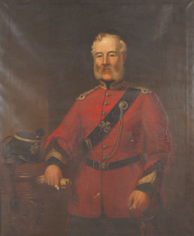
:Major Whitwell

=== Other known paintings ===
Paintings exhibited in the Royal Academy, British Institution and Sussex Street in 1836–67:

- 1839: Portrait of the son of Thomas Allom Esq., A.I.B.I.
- 1847: Miss Alice Jane Cornell.
- 1852: Miss Alice Batly Knipe.
- 1852: Master T Barrow.
- 1853: Janey Bell.

and many genre and figurative compositions in oils and watercolour. e.g. 1836 The Keepsake; 1842 The Reverie; 1855 Monday morning – conning the lesson (147 in all).

Sold in 2004 (Hislop's Art Sales index 2004):

- Mrs Thexton of Ashton House, Beethom
- Miss Jeanette Frances Thexton age 7yrs.

Marshal Hall in The Artists of Cumbria adds Carlisle Athenaeum; and John Grayson in the Abbot Hall, Kendal.

William Bowness painted Hartley Coleridge, son of poet Samuel Taylor Coleridge, and the genre pictures The Pride of Patterdale, The Cumberland Beggar and A Westmorland Lassie.
