= Aotea / Great Barrier Local Board =

Coordinates: 36.243632114°S 175.46681535°E

Aotea / Great Barrier Local Board Te Poari ā-Rohe o Aotea
- Local board of Aotea / Great Barrier Island
- Country: New Zealand
- Region: Auckland
- Territorial authority: Auckland Council
- Ward: Waitematā and Gulf Ward
- Legislated: 2010

Area
  - Land: 320.28 km^{2} (123.66 sq mi)

Local Board Members

Leadership
- Chairperson: Izzy Fordham, Independent
- Deputy chairperson: Chris Ollivier, Independent

Structure
- Seats: 5
- Political groups: Independents (5)
- Length of term: 3 years

Elections
- Last election: 2025
- Next election: 2028

Meeting place
- 81 Hector Sanderson Road, Claris, Great Barrier Island

Aotea / Great Barrier Local Board is one of the 21 local boards of the Auckland Council, and is represented by the council's Waitematā and Gulf Ward councillor.

The board's administrative area covers whole of the Great Barrier Island.

The board is governed by five board members elected at-large. The inaugural members were elected in the nationwide 2010 local elections, coinciding with the introduction of the Auckland Council.

== Demographics ==
Aotea/Great Barrier local board covers 320.28 km^{2} (123.66 sq mi) and had an estimated population of 1,250 as of June 2025, with a population density of 3.9 people per km^{2}.

Historical population
Year	Pop.	±% p.a.
2006	894	—
2013	939	+0.70%
2018	936	−0.06%
2023	1,251	+5.97%

Aotea/Great Barrier local board had a population of 1,251 in the 2023 New Zealand census, an increase of 315 people (33.7%) since the 2018 census, and an increase of 312 people (33.2%) since the 2013 census. There were 669 males, 579 females and 6 people of other genders in 705 dwellings. 3.6% of people identified as LGBTIQ+. The median age was 51.0 years (compared with 38.1 years nationally). There were 168 people (13.4%) aged under 15 years, 153 (12.2%) aged 15 to 29, 606 (48.4%) aged 30 to 64, and 324 (25.9%) aged 65 or older.

People could identify as more than one ethnicity. The results were 89.7% European (Pākehā); 22.8% Māori; 2.2% Pasifika; 1.7% Asian; 0.7% Middle Eastern, Latin American and African New Zealanders (MELAA); and 2.9% other, which includes people giving their ethnicity as "New Zealander". English was spoken by 97.6%, Māori language by 3.6%, and other languages by 8.2%. No language could be spoken by 1.7% (e.g. too young to talk). New Zealand Sign Language was known by 0.2%. The percentage of people born overseas was 19.2, compared with 28.8% nationally.

Religious affiliations were 18.7% Christian, 0.2% Hindu, 1.4% Māori religious beliefs, 0.7% Buddhist, 1.2% New Age, 0.2% Jewish, and 1.4% other religions. People who answered that they had no religion were 67.6%, and 8.9% of people did not answer the census question.

Of those at least 15 years old, 222 (20.5%) people had a bachelor's or higher degree, 582 (53.7%) had a post-high school certificate or diploma, and 273 (25.2%) people exclusively held high school qualifications. The median income was $28,500, compared with $41,500 nationally. 57 people (5.3%) earned over $100,000 compared to 12.1% nationally. The employment status of those at least 15 was that 402 (37.1%) people were employed full-time, 222 (20.5%) were part-time, and 33 (3.0%) were unemployed.

== 2025-2028 term ==
The current board members for the 2025-2028 term, elected at the 2025 local elections, are:

Name	Affiliation	Position
Izzy Fordham	Independent	Chairperson
Chris Ollivier		Deputy Chairperson
Neil Sanderson		Board member
Nikki Watts	Independent	Board member
Ryan Daly		Board member

== 2022-2025 term ==
The board members for the 2022-2025 term, elected in the 2022 local elections,were:

Izzy Fordham (Chair), Independent
Patrick O'Shea (Deputy Chair), Independent
Neil Sanderson, Independent
Chris Ollivier, Independent
Laura Caine, None
