= Mount Hobson (Great Barrier Island) =

Mountain on Great Barrier Island, New Zealand

Coordinates: 36°11′S 175°25′E

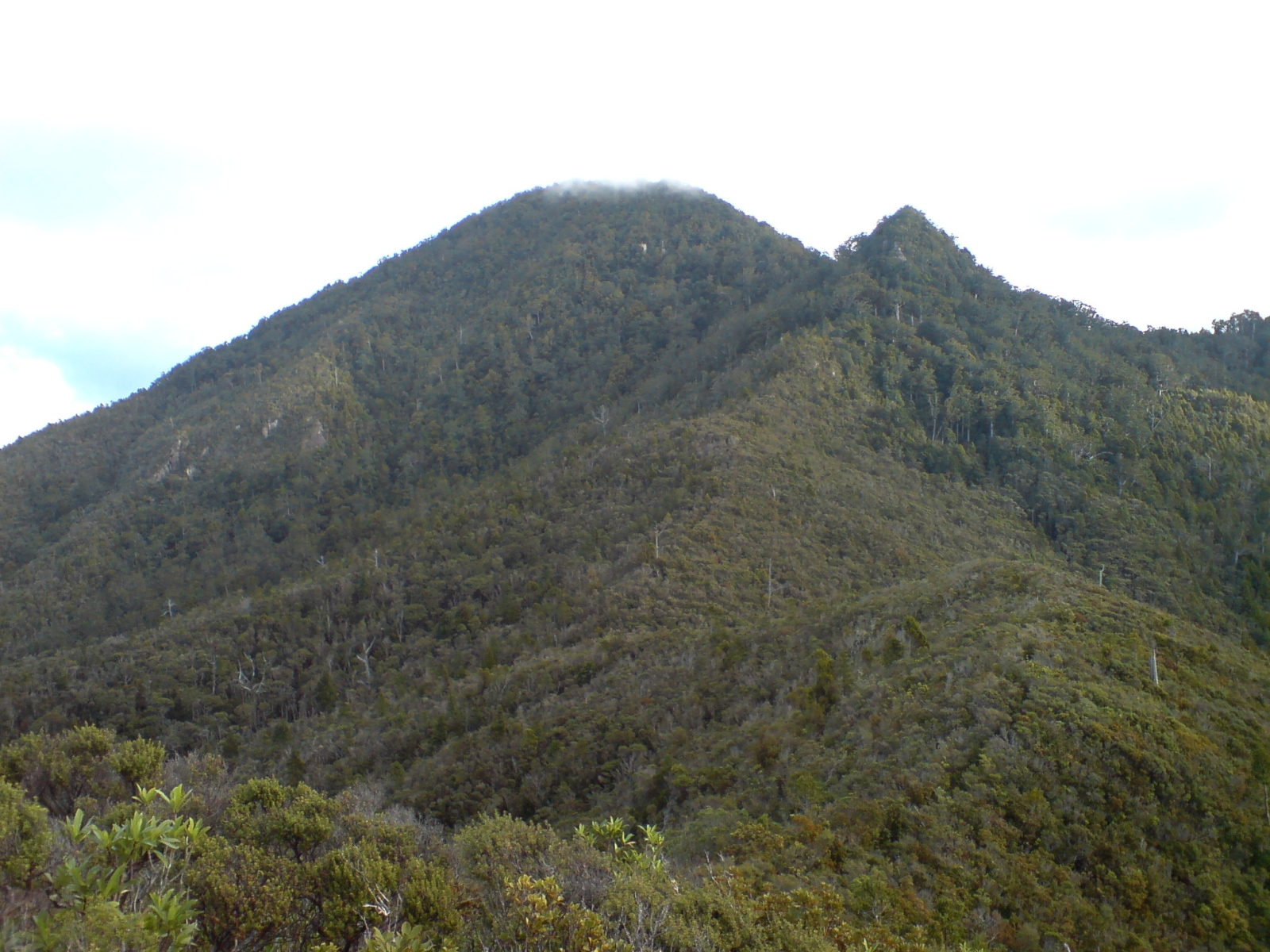
Mount Hobson from the east

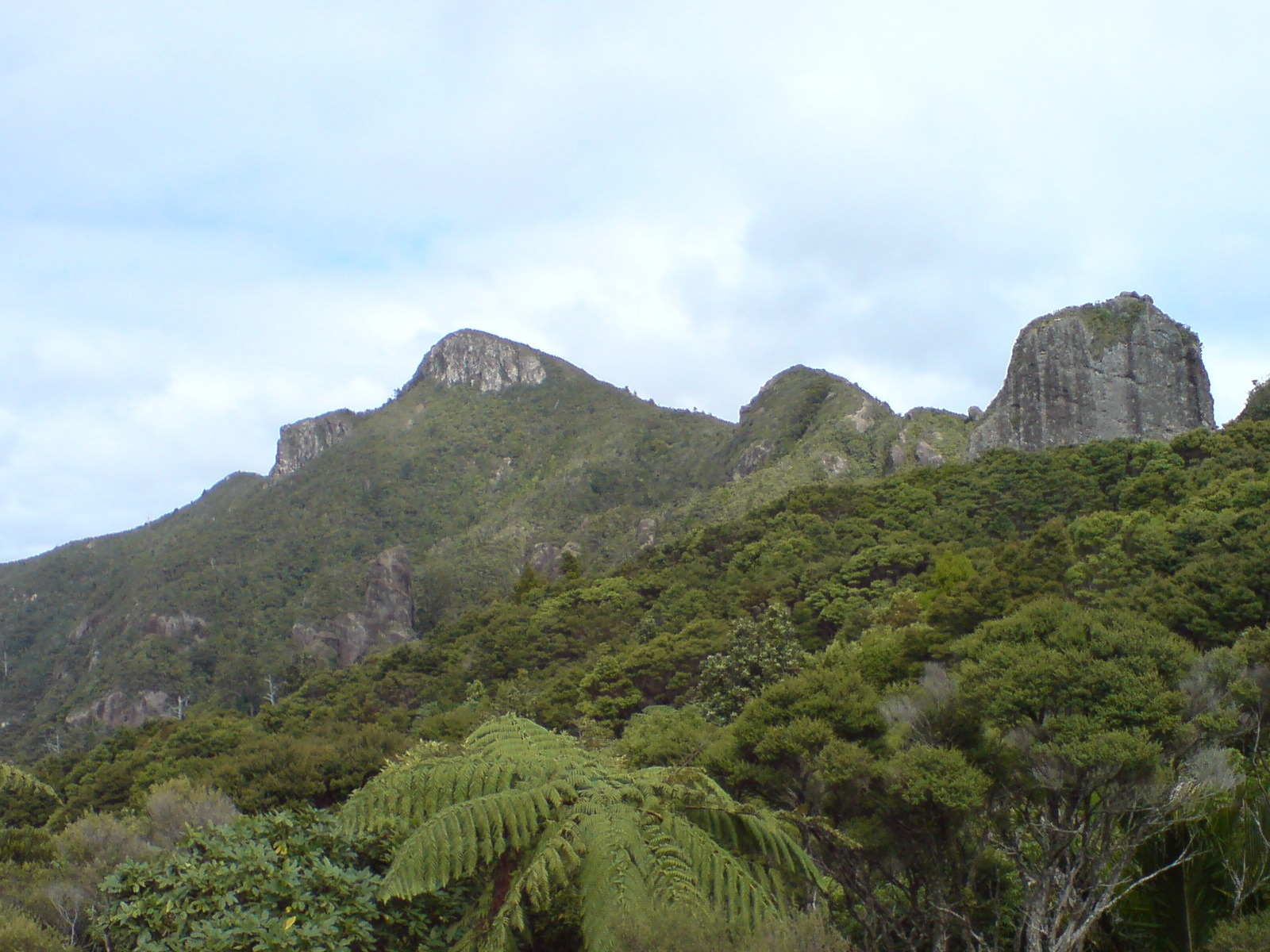
The ridge path from Windy Canyon

Mount Hobson (Māori: Hirakimatā) is the highest mountain on Great Barrier Island, New Zealand. Located in the centre of the island, it rises 627 m (2,057 ft) above sea level.

== Geography ==
Various mountain tracks allow relatively easy access to the summit, with the shortest (2 hour) track leading through the famous Windy Canyon. Great views over the island to the Coromandel Peninsula and the Poor Knights Islands are often possible from the top of the mountain. The summit area is a breeding ground for the black petrel, and the track in this part is mostly composed of boardwalks and stairs to protect the breeding areas and prevent erosion. A number of rare and declining plants on the mainland are largely restricted (or completely restricted) to Great Barrier Island are found on Mount Hobson, these include, Pittosporum kirkii, Epacris sinclairii, Kunzea sinclairii, and also Olearia allomii.

== Geology ==
Mount Hobson is the caldera of a complex rhyolite lava dome, which was active between 12 and 8 million years ago as a part of the Coromandel Volcanic Zone.
