= Great Barrier Island =

Island in New Zealand

Aotea (Māori) Nickname: The Barrier
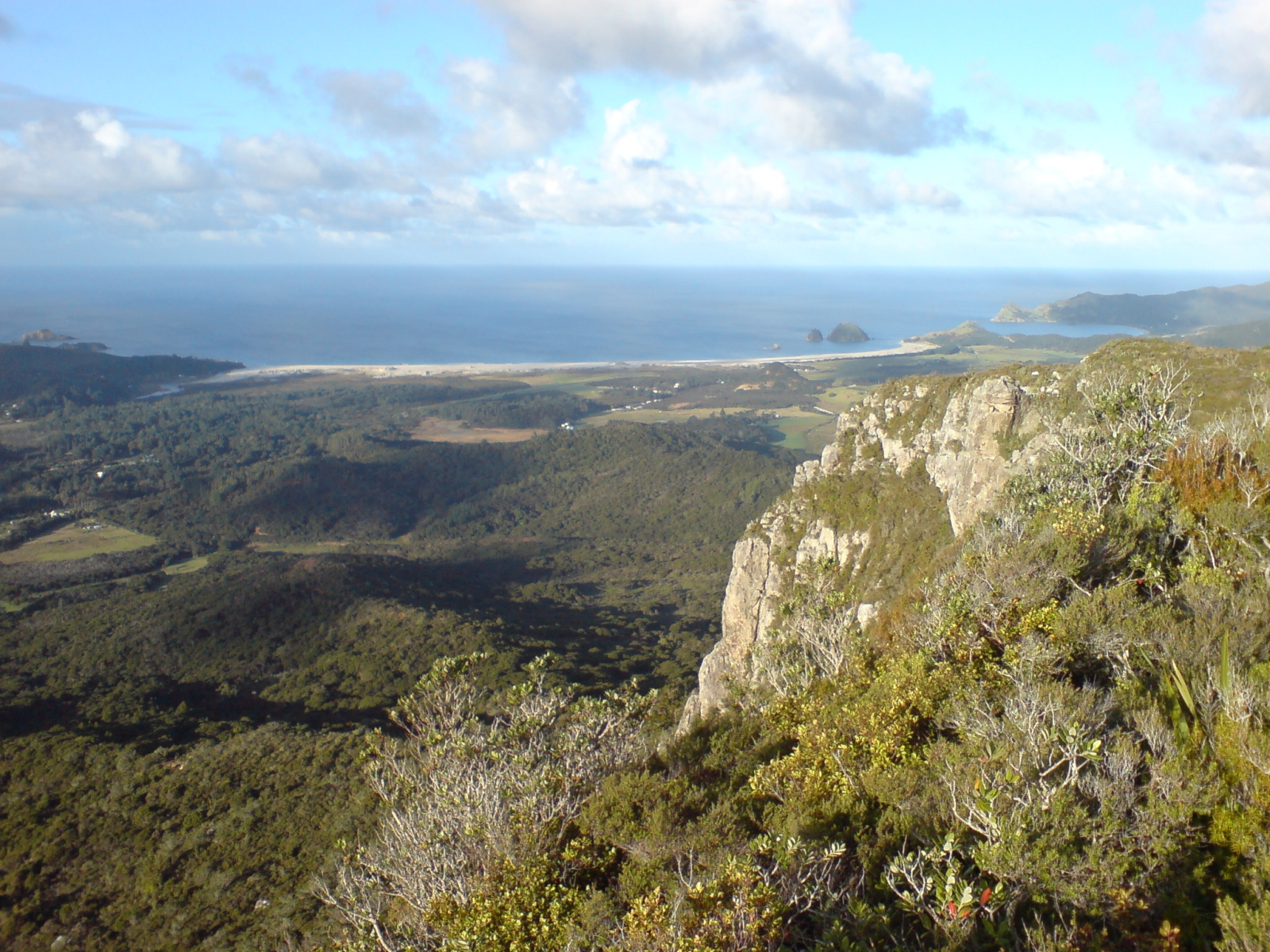
- Kaitoke Beach in the east of Great Barrier Island. The "White Cliffs" can be seen in the front right.

- Location within New Zealand

Geography
- Location: North Island
- Coordinates: 36°12′S 175°25′E
- Area: 285 km^{2} (110 sq mi)
- Highest elevation: 621 m (2037 ft)
- Highest point: Mount Hobson or Hirakimatā

Administration
- New Zealand

Demographics
- Population: 1,230 (June 2025)
- Pop. density: 4.3/km^{2} (11.1/sq mi)

Great Barrier Island (Māori: Aotea) lies in the outer Hauraki Gulf, New Zealand, 100 kilometres (62 mi) north-east of central Auckland. With an area of 285 square kilometres (110 sq mi) it is the sixth-largest island of New Zealand. Its highest point, Mount Hobson, is 627 metres (2,057 ft) above sea level. The local authority is the Auckland Council.

The island was initially exploited for its minerals and kauri trees and saw only limited agriculture. In 2013, it was inhabited by 939 people, mostly living from farming and tourism and all living off-the-grid. The majority of the island (around 60% of the total area) is administered as a nature reserve by the Department of Conservation. The island atmosphere is sometimes described as being "life in New Zealand many decades back".

== Etymology ==
The Māori name of the island is Aotea. It received its English name from Captain Cook because it acts as a barrier between the Pacific Ocean and the Hauraki Gulf. Entrance to the Hauraki Gulf is via two channels, one on each side of the island. Colville Channel separates the southernmost point, Cape Barrier, from Cape Colville at the northern tip of the Coromandel Peninsula to the south, Cradock Channel from the smaller Little Barrier Island to the west. The island protects the Hauraki Gulf from the ocean surface waves and the currents of the South Pacific Gyre. It is not a sandbar barrier, often defined as the correct use of the term. The island's English name stems from its location on the outskirts of the Hauraki Gulf.

== Geography ==
With an area of 285 square kilometres (110 sq mi), Great Barrier Island is the sixth-largest island in New Zealand after the South Island, the North Island, Stewart Island / Rakiura, Chatham Island, and Auckland Island. The highest point, Mount Hobson or Hirakimatā, is 627 metres (2,057 ft) above sea level.

Great Barrier is surrounded by several smaller islands, including Kaikoura Island, Rakitu Island, Aiguilles Island and Dragon Island. A number of islands are located in Great Barrier bays, including Motukahu Island, Nelson Island, Kaikoura Island, Broken Islands, Motutaiko Island, Rangiahua Island, Little Mahuki Island, Mahuki Island and Junction Islands.

With a maximum length (north-south) of some 43 kilometres (27 mi), it and the Coromandel Peninsula (directly to its south) protect the Gulf from the storms of the Pacific Ocean to the east. Consequently, the island boasts highly contrasting coastal environments. The eastern coast comprises long, sandy beaches, windswept sand-dunes, and at times heavy surf. The western coast, sheltered and calm, is home to hundreds of tiny, secluded bays which offer some of the best diving and boating in the country. The inland holds several large and biologically diverse wetlands, along with rugged hill country (bush or heath in the more exposed heights), as well as old-growth and regenerating kauri forests.

=== Surrounding islands ===
Surrounding islands and islets:

Name	Coordinates
Aiguilles Island	36.035°S 175.407°E
Bird Islet	36.312°S 175.471°E
Bird Rocks	36.113°S 175.346°E
Grey Group Islands	36.187°S 175.301°E
Junction Islands	36.230°S 175.318°E
Kaikōura Island / Selwyn Island	36.177°S 175.324°E
Moturako Island	36.180°S 175.297°E
Motuhaku Island	36.163°S 175.289°E
Nelson Island / Peter Island	36.166°S 175.299°E
Palmers Island	36.224°S 175.486°E
Pitokuku Island	36.253°S 175.492°E
Little Mahuki Island	36.228°S 175.307°E
Lion Rock	36.220°S 175.493°E
Mahuki Island / Anvil Island	36.233°S 175.302°E
Motutaiko Island	36.217°S 175.289°E
Okokewa Island / Green Island	36.143°S 175.309°E
Opakau Island	36.202°S 175.299°E
Oyster Island	36.142°S 175.325°E
Papakuri Island	36.220°S 175.289°E
Rabbit Island	36.147°S 175.314°E
Rakitu Island (Arid Island)	36.128°S 175.496°E
Rangiahua Island (Flat Island)	36.221°S 175.302°E
The Pigeons / Piroque Rocks	36.274°S 175.331°E
Wood Island	36.152°S 175.334°E
Whangara Island (Cliff Island)	36.255°S 175.371°E
Quoin Island / Graves Island	36.172°S 175.357°E

=== Climate ===
Climate data for Port Fitzroy, Great Barrier Island (1991–2020 normals, extremes 1961–2003)
Month	Jan	Feb	Mar	Apr	May	Jun	Jul	Aug	Sep	Oct	Nov	Dec	Year
Record high °C (°F)	28.7 (83.7)	29.9 (85.8)	27.5 (81.5)	25.9 (78.6)	22.8 (73.0)	22.5 (72.5)	19.5 (67.1)	20.2 (68.4)	21.5 (70.7)	23.4 (74.1)	24.3 (75.7)	27.1 (80.8)	29.9 (85.8)
Mean daily maximum °C (°F)	23.9 (75.0)	24.0 (75.2)	22.8 (73.0)	20.9 (69.6)	18.5 (65.3)	16.5 (61.7)	15.7 (60.3)	15.9 (60.6)	17.2 (63.0)	18.5 (65.3)	20.3 (68.5)	22.4 (72.3)	19.7 (67.5)
Daily mean °C (°F)	19.7 (67.5)	20.1 (68.2)	18.9 (66.0)	16.9 (62.4)	15.0 (59.0)	13.1 (55.6)	12.2 (54.0)	12.4 (54.3)	13.4 (56.1)	14.8 (58.6)	16.4 (61.5)	18.5 (65.3)	16.0 (60.7)
Mean daily minimum °C (°F)	15.4 (59.7)	16.2 (61.2)	15.0 (59.0)	13.0 (55.4)	11.4 (52.5)	9.7 (49.5)	8.8 (47.8)	8.9 (48.0)	9.7 (49.5)	11.1 (52.0)	12.5 (54.5)	14.6 (58.3)	12.2 (54.0)
Record low °C (°F)	7.0 (44.6)	6.2 (43.2)	5.6 (42.1)	4.5 (40.1)	1.7 (35.1)	0.2 (32.4)	0.4 (32.7)	1.3 (34.3)	2.3 (36.1)	1.9 (35.4)	3.3 (37.9)	7.3 (45.1)	0.2 (32.4)
Average rainfall mm (inches)	92.3 (3.63)	120.0 (4.72)	134.1 (5.28)	115.1 (4.53)	159.0 (6.26)	165.8 (6.53)	245.6 (9.67)	178.2 (7.02)	132.0 (5.20)	99.8 (3.93)	102.7 (4.04)	127.6 (5.02)	1,672.2 (65.83)
Source: NIWA

== Geology and natural history ==
Great Barrier Island surface volcanics map with andesite in red shading and rhyolite in violet shading. Legend: Key for the volcanics that are shown with panning is: basalt (shades of brown/orange); monogenetic basalts; undifferentiated basalts of the Tangihua Complex in Northland Allochthon; arc basalts; arc ring basalts; dacite; andesite (shades of red); basaltic andesite; rhyolite (ignimbrite is lighter shades of violet); plutonic; White shading is selected caldera features.; Clicking on the rectangle icon enables full window and mouse-over with volcano name/wikilink and ages before present.

Much of Great Barrier Island is formed from remnants of volcanoes associated with the Coromandel Volcanic Zone. The North Great Barrier Volcano, which was centred to the north of the modern island from Whangapoua Bay northwards, formed through events between 18 and 17 million years ago; some of the earliest vulcanism which occurred in the zone. The Great Barrier Volcano formed to the west of the modern island between 15 and 12 million years ago. Much of the modern island is this volcano's eroded eastern flanks. The third volcano, Mount Hobson, is the caldera of a complex rhyolite dome volcano, which was active between 12 and 8 million years ago.

Great Barrier Island has been linked to the North Island for most of the last 18 million years, by a land bridge to the south along the Colville Channel. Approximately 17,000 years ago during the Last Glacial Maximum, the Hauraki Gulf was a low-lying coastal plain as sea levels were over 100 metres lower than present day levels. During this period, Great Barrier Island was bordered by the two major river systems that flowed on the plain. Over the past two million years, Great Barrier has periodically been an island and a peninsula.

== History and culture ==
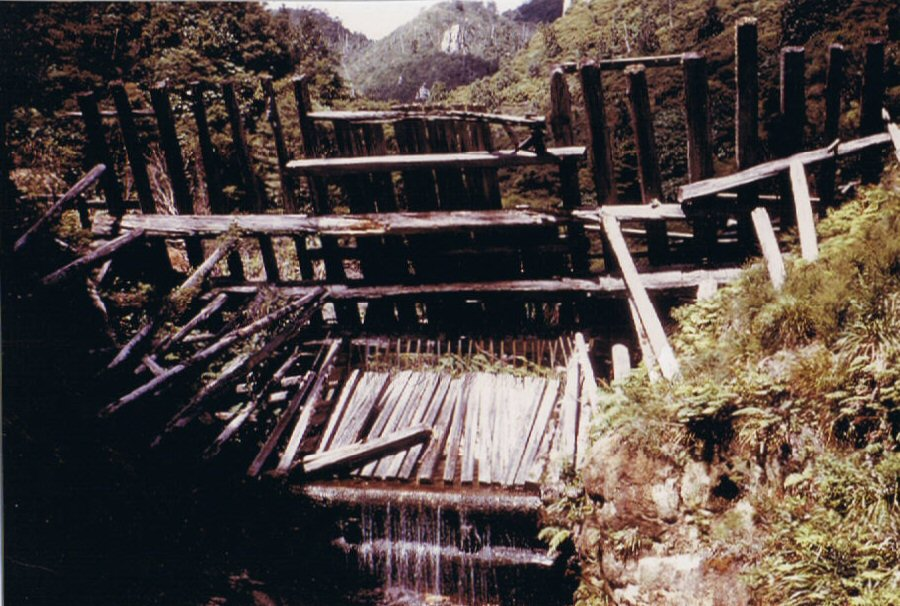
A kauri driving dam on Great Barrier Island, 1967. Logging was one of the early industries on the island, and this dam provided enough water to drive kauri logs 16 km (10 mi) to the sea.

Great Barrier Island (Aotea) is the ancestral land of Ngāti Rehua Ngātiwai ki Aotea who are the mana whenua (territorial land rights holders) of Aotea. Ngāti Rehua have occupied Aotea since the 17th century after conquering Aotea from people of Ngāti Manaia and Kawerau descent. In the mid-19th century during the early Colonial era of New Zealand, extensive private and crown land purchases meant only two areas of the Hauraki Gulf remained in Māori ownership: Te Huruhi (Surfdale) on Waiheke Island (2100 acres) on Waiheke and a 3,510 acre parcel of land at Katherine Bay on Great Barrier Island.

=== Local industries ===
==== Mining ====
Early European interest followed discovery of copper in the remote north, where New Zealand's earliest mines were established at Miners Head in 1842. Traces of these mines remain, largely accessible only by boat. Later, gold and silver were found in the Okupu / Whangaparapara area in the 1890s, and the remains of a stamping battery on the Whangaparapara Road are a remainder of this time. The sound of the battery working was reputedly audible from the Coromandel Peninsula, 20 km away.

In early 2010, a government proposal to remove 705 ha of land on the Te Ahumatā Plateau (called "White Cliffs" by the locals) from Schedule 4 of the Crown Minerals Act, which gives protection from the mining of public land, was widely criticised. Concerns were that mining for the suspected $4.3 billion in mineral worth in the area would damage both the conservation land as well as the island's tourism economy. Locals were split on the project, some hoping for new jobs. If restarted, mining at White Cliffs would occur in the same area it originally proliferated on Great Barrier. The area's regenerating bushland still holds numerous semi-collapsed or open mining shafts where silver and gold had been mined.

==== Kauri logging ====
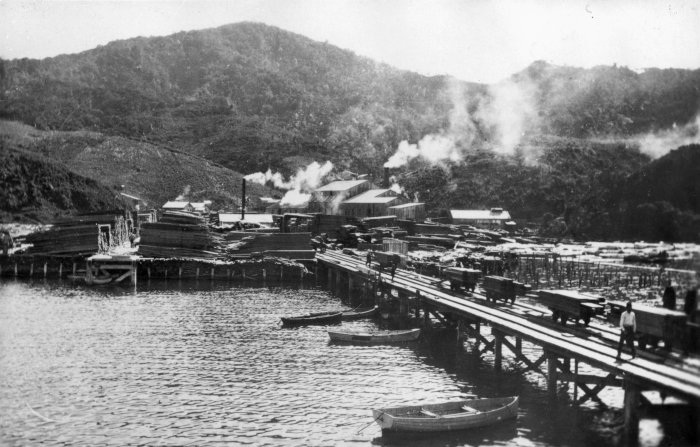
The sawmill at Whangaparapara, c. 1910

The kauri logging industry was profitable in early European days and up to the mid-20th century. Forests were well inland, with no easy way to get the logs to the sea or to sawmills. Kauri logs were dragged to a convenient stream bed with steep sides and a driving dam was constructed of wood, with a lifting gate near the bottom large enough for the logs to pass through. When the dam had filled, which might take up to a year, the gate was opened and the logs above the dam were pushed out through the hole and swept down to the sea. The logging industry cut down large amounts of old growth, and most of the current growth is younger native forest (around 150,000 kauri seedlings were planted by the New Zealand Forest Service in the 1970s and 1980s) as well as some remaining kauri in the far north of the island. Much of the island is covered with regenerating bush dominated by kanuka and kauri.

==== Other industries ====
Great Barrier Island was the site of New Zealand's last whaling station, at Whangaparapara, which opened in 1956, over a century after the whaling industry peaked in New Zealand, and closed due to depletion of whaling stocks and increasing protection of whales by 1962.

Another small-scale industry was kauri gum digging, while dairy farming and sheep farming have tended to play a small role compared to the usual New Zealand practice. A fishing industry collapsed when international fish prices dropped. Islanders are generally occupied in tourism, farming or service-related industries when not working off-island.

=== Shipwrecks ===
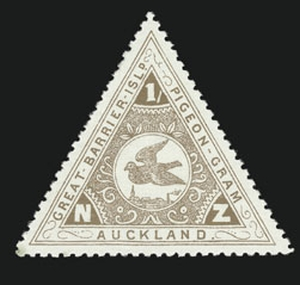
Great Barrier Island pigeon post stamp

The remote north was the site of the sinking of the SS Wairarapa around midnight of 29 October 1894. This was one of New Zealand's worst shipwrecks, with about 140 lives lost, some of them buried in two beach grave sites in the far north. As a result, a Great Barrier Island pigeon post service was set up, the first message being flown on 14 May 1897. Special postage stamps were issued from October 1898 until 1908, when a new communications cable was laid to the mainland, which made the pigeon post redundant. Another major wreck lies in the far southeast, the SS Wiltshire.

=== Nature reserves ===
Over time, more and more of the island came under the stewardship of the Department of Conservation (DOC) or its predecessors. Partly this was land that had belonged to the Crown since the 1800s, while other parts were sold or donated like the more than 10% of the island (located in the northern bush area, with some of the largest remaining kauri forests) that was gifted to the Crown by farmer Max Burrill in 1984. DOC has created a large number of walking tracks through the island, some of which are also open for mountain biking. The Aotea Conservation Park has the only multi-day wilderness walk in the Auckland region, boasting two DOC huts and numerous campsites. The Park spreads over more than 12,000 hectares and offers multiple walking tracks for novice and experienced walkers.

The island is free of some of the more troublesome introduced pests that plague the native ecosystems of other parts of New Zealand. While it does have wild cats, feral pigs, black rats (R. rattus), Polynesian rats (R. exulans), mice and rabbits, there are no possums, mustelids (weasels, stoats or ferrets), hedgehogs, brown rats (R. norvegicus), deer or (since 2006) feral goats, thus being a relative haven for native bird and plant populations. Rare birds found on the island include brown teal ducks, black petrels and kākā.

=== Marae ===
Great Barrier Island has two marae affiliated with the local iwi of Ngāti Rehua and Ngātiwai: the Kawa Marae and its Rehua meeting house, and Motairehe Marae and its Whakaruruhau meeting house.

In October 2020, the Government committed $313,007 from the Provincial Growth Fund to upgrade Kawa Marae, creating 6 jobs.

=== Dark Sky Sanctuary ===
In 2017, Aotea / Great Barrier Island was accredited as a Dark Sky Sanctuary by the International Dark-Sky Association. This designation is given for sites in very remote locations to increase awareness of their dark sky characteristics and promote long term conservation. At the time, it was the third International Dark Sky Sanctuary to be designated, and the first island sanctuary.

== Population ==
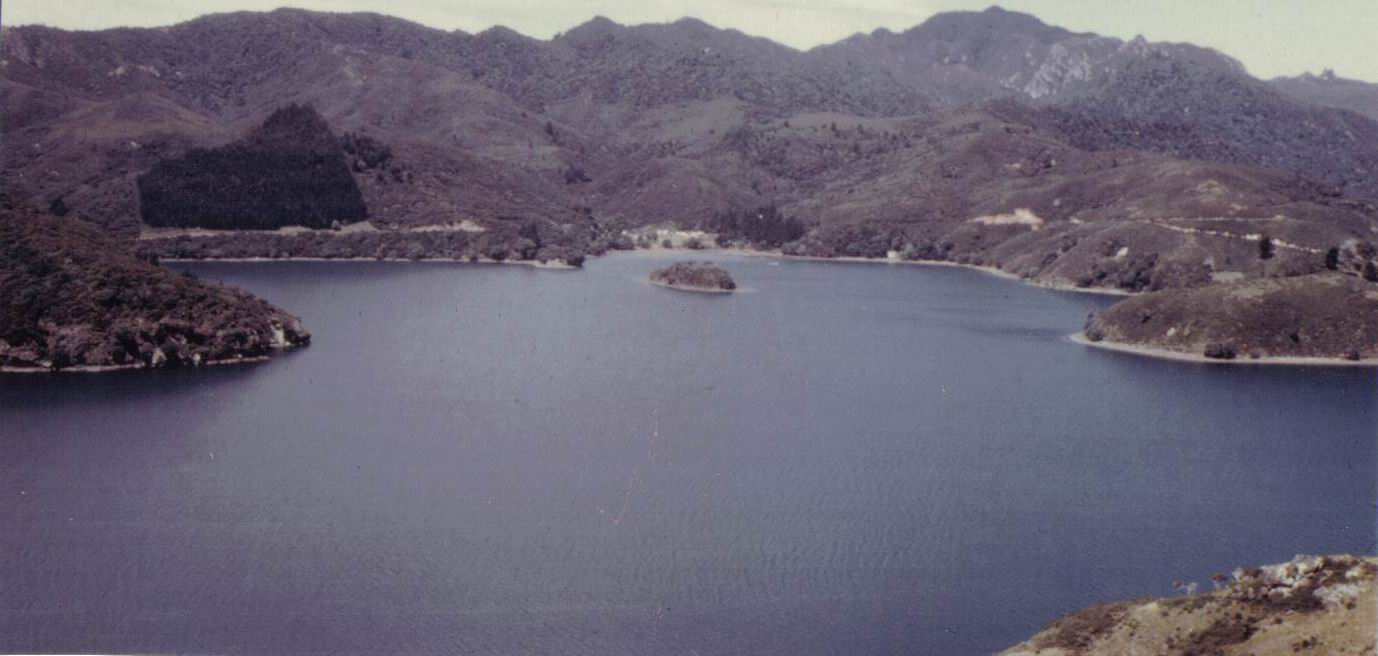
Port Fitzroy from the top of Kaikoura Island (previously Selwyn Island), 1967

Barrier Islands statistical area, which includes Little Barrier Island and Mokohinau Islands although they have no permanent inhabitants, covers 320.28 km^{2} (123.66 sq mi) and had an estimated population of 1,230 as of June 2025, with a population density of 3.8 people per km^{2}.

Historical population
Year	Pop.	±% p.a.
2006	867	—
2013	933	+1.05%
2018	936	+0.06%
2023	1,239	+5.77%

Barrier Islands had a population of 1,239 in the 2023 New Zealand census, an increase of 303 people (32.4%) since the 2018 census, and an increase of 306 people (32.8%) since the 2013 census. There were 660 males, 573 females and 6 people of other genders in 681 dwellings. 3.6% of people identified as LGBTIQ+. The median age was 51.0 years (compared with 38.1 years nationally). There were 162 people (13.1%) aged under 15 years, 153 (12.3%) aged 15 to 29, 603 (48.7%) aged 30 to 64, and 324 (26.2%) aged 65 or older.

People could identify as more than one ethnicity. The results were 89.8% European (Pākehā); 23.0% Māori; 2.2% Pasifika; 1.7% Asian; 0.7% Middle Eastern, Latin American and African New Zealanders (MELAA); and 2.9% other, which includes people giving their ethnicity as "New Zealander". English was spoken by 97.8%, Māori language by 3.6%, and other languages by 8.0%. No language could be spoken by 1.7% (e.g. too young to talk). New Zealand Sign Language was known by 0.2%. The percentage of people born overseas was 18.9, compared with 28.8% nationally.

Religious affiliations were 18.9% Christian, 0.2% Hindu, 1.5% Māori religious beliefs, 0.7% Buddhist, 1.2% New Age, 0.2% Jewish, and 1.5% other religions. People who answered that they had no religion were 67.6%, and 9.0% of people did not answer the census question.

Of those at least 15 years old, 162 (15.0%) people had a bachelor's or higher degree, 579 (53.8%) had a post-high school certificate or diploma, and 267 (24.8%) people exclusively held high school qualifications. The median income was $28,500, compared with $41,500 nationally. 57 people (5.3%) earned over $100,000 compared to 12.1% nationally. The employment status of those at least 15 was that 402 (37.3%) people were employed full-time, 222 (20.6%) were part-time, and 33 (3.1%) were unemployed.

== Settlements ==
The population lives mostly in coastal settlements. Tryphena, in Tryphena Harbour at the southern end, is the largest settlement. Other communities are Okupu and Whangaparapara in the south-west, Port Fitzroy and Ōkiwi in the north, and Claris and Medlands in the south-east. The population swells substantially from October to May. The island has become a favourite holiday destination in the darker months, due its superbly dark sky and the astrophotography and stargazing opportunities this offers. In 2017 the island was given Dark Sky Sanctuary status by the IDA. Its relative remoteness offers solitude, and the sustainable off-grid lifestyle of its inhabitants is something many visitors like to experience.

Without reticulated electricity, most houses use solar panels and a battery bank to generate and store power. Wind and water turbines and solar water heaters are also used. Diesel generators, which used to be the main power source, are now mostly used as back-up.

From the end of February 2007, the island was seen around the world as the setting for the BBC One reality show Castaway, which was filmed there for three months.

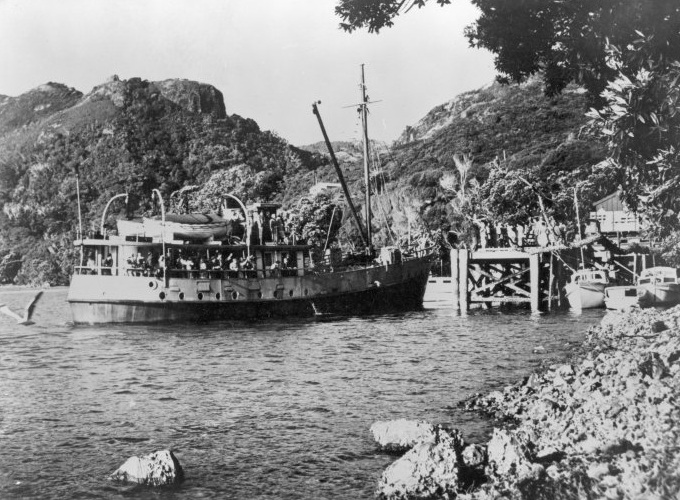
A ferry tying up at the Port Fitzroy wharf in about 1910

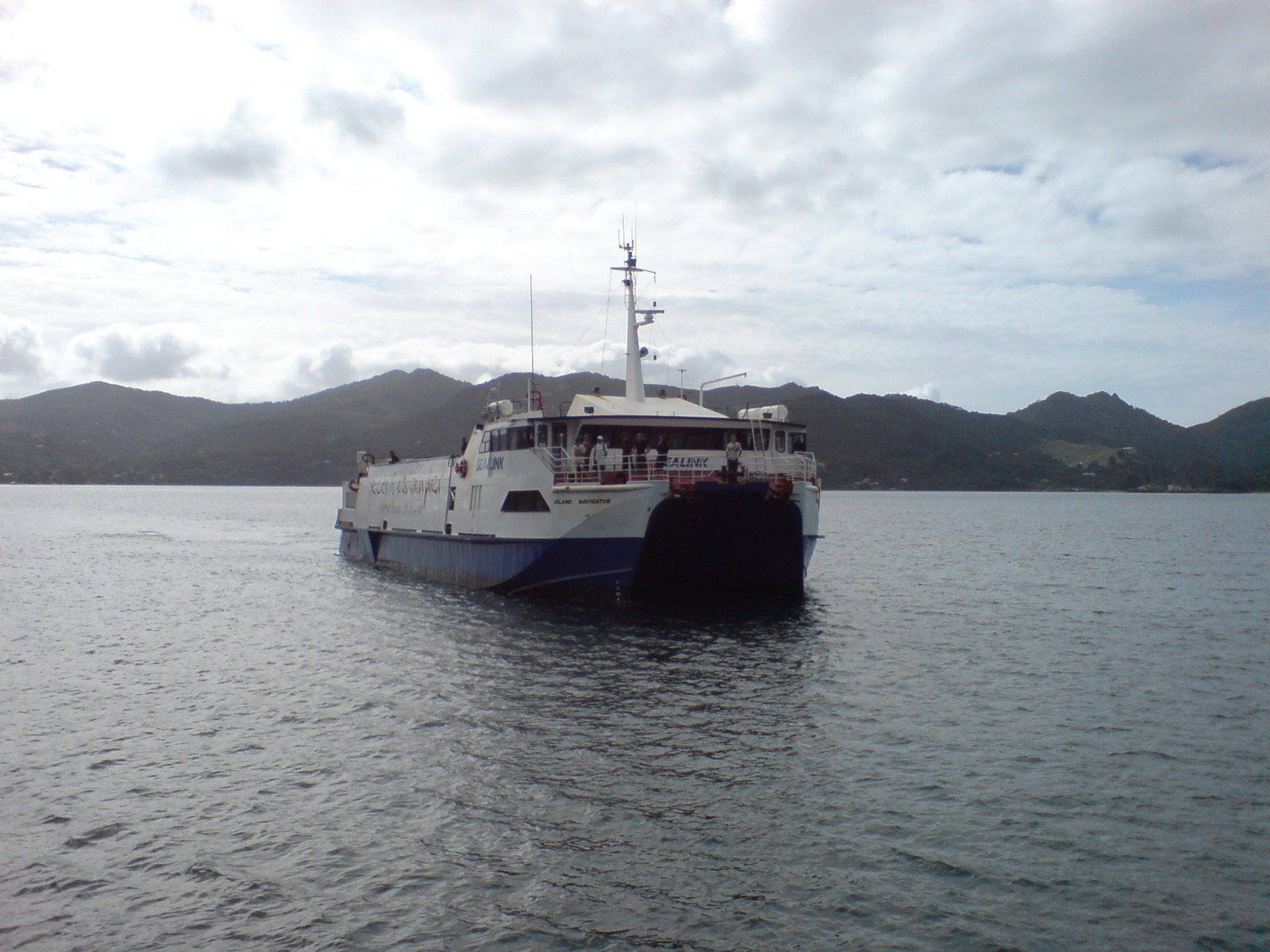
The Island Navigator vehicle ferry from Wynyard Wharf, Auckland. It takes about 4.5 hours, and transports tourists and locals working off-island.

== Transport ==
There are two airfields on the island, Great Barrier Aerodrome at Claris and Okiwi Airfield. Barrier Air operates services from Auckland Airport, North Shore Aerodrome, and Tauranga to Claris. Flight time is approximately 30 minutes from Auckland Airport. Sunair operates between Claris and Hamilton, Tauranga, Whangārei and Whitianga.

SeaLink operates a passenger, car and freight ferry. This ferry operates from Wynyard Wharf in Auckland City to Tryphena (several times weekly). Sailing time is approximately four and a half hours.

Other ways to access the island include by seaplane or water taxi.

== Civic institutions ==
Institutions and services are primarily provided by the Auckland Council, the local authority. Services and infrastructure like roads and the wharves at Tryphena and Whangaparapara are subsidised, with the island receiving about $4 in services for every $1 in rates. The Port FitzRoy wharf is owned by the North Barrier Residents and Ratepayers Association.

There are three primary schools: Mulberry Grove School at Tryphena, Kaitoke School at Claris, and Okiwi School. There is no secondary school, but there is a learning hub to assist students who learn through the New Zealand Correspondence School. Many children leave the island when they reach secondary school age to attend boarding school on the mainland. Previously, the lack of secondary schooling was cited as one of the reasons for a slow exodus of long-term resident families.

As part of Auckland the rules governing daily activities and applicable standards for civic works and services exists, shared with some of the other inhabited islands of the Hauraki Gulf. Driving rules are the same as for the rest of NZ and registration and a Warrant of Fitness are required for all vehicles. For example, every transport service operated solely on the island, the Chatham Islands, or Stewart Island/Rakiura is exempt from section 70C of the Transport Act 1962, the requirements for drivers to maintain driving-hours logbooks. Drivers subject to section 70B must nevertheless keep records of their driving hours in some form.

Rules governing dog control are the same as for Auckland. Dogs must be kept on a lead in all public places.

== Notable residents ==
- Fanny Osborne (1852–1934), artist
- Jamison Gibson-Park, rugby union player
- Jenni Ogden, New Zealand psychology researcher and writer
- Paul Silva (1897–1974), soldier, timber worker, axeman and bridge builder

== See also ==
- Harataonga, a beach
- Dark sky movement in New Zealand
- List of islands of New Zealand
