= Endemic biota of the Auckland Region =

The Auckland region of New Zealand is home to numerous endemic flora and fauna. Many of these species have ranges restricted to the Waitākere Ranges, Great Barrier Island, Little Barrier Island and the Mokohinau Islands. A number of species have restricted ranges that include areas outside of the Auckland region, such as Buller's shearwater and Pycroft's petrel, or organisms such as the brown teal / pateke and stitchbird / hihi which have recently increased ranges due to conservation efforts.

Currently no freshwater fish species are known to be endemic to the Auckland region.

== Endemic species ==
Species below have been described as endemic to the Auckland region.

Image	Common name(s)	Scientific name	Type of organism	Distribution	Notes
		Celmisia major var. major	plant	Waitākere Ranges, Great Barrier Island group	Found in coastal cliff faces in the Waitākere Ranges (Muriwai to Cornwallis), as well as Aiguilles Island, Great Barrier Island, where it may be extinct, and Kaikōura Island.
	Mokohinau gecko	Dactylocnemis "Mokohinau"	reptile	Mokohinau Islands	Currently an undescribed species
	Little Barrier giant wētā, wētāpunga	Deinacrida heteracantha	insect	Little Barrier Island	Formerly found on the mainland in Northland region and Auckland region. Captive breeding programmes have established populations on Motuora and Tiritiri Matangi Island.
	New Zealand storm petrel	Fregetta maoriana	bird	Little Barrier Island	The bird's only known breeding sites are found on Little Barrier Island.
	Mokohinau stag beetle	Geodorcus ithaginis	insect	Mokohinau Islands	Currently only known from a single sea stack in the island group.
	Great Barrier Island kānuka	Kunzea sinclairii	plant	Great Barrier Island	Often found in gorges and cliffs of central Great Barrier Island.
	Waitakere scurvy grass	Lepidium amissum†	plant	Waitākere Ranges	The species is extinct, last observed in 1917. It was formerly found along coastal cliffs of the Waitākere Ranges.
		Libertia flaccidifolia	plant	Rodney	Previously thought to be restricted to Mount Tamahunga, the species may also be present in southern Northland region.
		Lindbergia maritima	plant	Waitākere Ranges	Moss species known from one locality in the Waitākere Ranges.
		Mecodema aoteanoho	insect	Great Barrier Island	Typically found in broadleaf forests of Great Barrier Island.
		Mecodema dunnorum	insect	Rodney	Found in native forest reserves near Puhoi in Rodney.
		Mecodema haunoho	insect	Little Barrier Island	Typically found in the broadleaf forests of southwestern Little Barrier Island.
		Migas insularis	spider	Little Barrier Island	Known only to occur on Little Barrier Island, type specimen found on the Tom Thumb Track.
		Migas minor	spider	Waitākere Ranges	Known from a single female specimen, found inside a tree trunk in the Waitākere Ranges.
		Migas sandageri	spider	Mokohinau Islands	May also be present on the Poor Knights Islands.
	Waitakere forget-me-not	Myosotis pansa subsp. pansa	plant	Waitākere Ranges	Found in coastal cliff faces in the Waitākere Ranges.
		Neoramia finschi	spider	Auckland	Known only to occur in the Auckland area.
		Stanwellia hapua	spider	Little Barrier Island	Known only to occur on Little Barrier Island, type specimen found on the Little Barrier Island summit track.
	Great Barrier tree daisy	Olearia allomii	plant	Great Barrier Island group	
	chevron skink, niho taniwha	Oligosoma homalonotum	reptile	Great Barrier Island, Little Barrier Island	Currently restricted to Great Barrier Island and Little Barrier Island, the species was formerly found in Northland region on the mainland.
	Black petrel, tāiko, tākoketai, Parkinson's petrel	Procellaria parkinsoni	bird	Great Barrier Island, Little Barrier Island	The bird's only known breeding sites are located on Great Barrier Island and Little Barrier Island.
	Northern Cook's petrel	Pterodroma cookii cookii	bird	Great Barrier Island, Little Barrier Island	The subspecies is known to breeding only on Great Barrier Island and Little Barrier Island.
	Mokohinau groundsel	Senecio pokohinuensis	plant	Mokohinau Islands	Commonly found in association with petrel breeding grounds in the Mokohinau Islands.
	Waitākere rock koromiko	Veronica bishopiana	plant	Waitākere Ranges	Commonly found on stream sides and cliff faces.
	Riverhead speedwell	Veronica jovellanoides	plant	Rodney	Exclusive to the Ernest Morgan Reserve in Riverhead Forest.
		Veronica pubescens subsp. rehuarum	plant	Great Barrier Island	Typically found in open coastal areas or scrubland.
		Veronica pubescens subsp. sejuncta	plant	Mokohinau Islands, Little Barrier Island	Typically found in open coastal areas or scrublands.
	Korowai gecko, Muriwai gecko	Woodworthia korowai	reptile	Muriwai Beach, Oaia Island	Primarily found in sand dunes on Te Korowai-o-Te-Tonga Peninsula and on Oaia Island

== Near, former or potentially endemic species ==
The species listed below variously have ranges that are close to endemic to the Auckland region, were formerly restricted to the Auckland region, or may potentially be endemic.

Image	Common name(s)	Scientific name	Type of organism	Distribution	Notes
	brown teal, pāteke	Anas chlorotis	bird	New Zealand	Historically restricted to Auckland region and Northland region, the species is now present in the South Island.
	Buller's shearwater	Ardenna bulleri	bird	Hauraki Gulf	Has breeding sites across the Hauraki Gulf
		Dictyomeridium neureuterae	lichen	Ōtata Island, the Noises	As of 2024 has only been identified on the bark of Pseudopanax lessonii on Ōtata Island.
	Great Barrier inaka	Dracophyllum patens	plant	Great Barrier Island, Coromandel Peninsula	Found primarily above 300 m (980 ft) above sealevel in rhyolitic soil on Great Barrier Island and the Coromandel Peninsula.
	Sinclair's tamingi	Epacris sinclairii	plant	Great Barrier Island, Coromandel Peninsula	Found primarily above 300 m (980 ft) above sealevel in rhyolitic soil on Great Barrier Island and the Coromandel Peninsula.
		Hierodoris huia	insect	Waitākere Ranges	Currently only two observations of the species have been made, in the vicinity of Titirangi.
		Ichneutica peridotea	insect	Auckland region	While all observations of the species have been made in the Auckland region, it is suspected to also live in the Northland region.
		Microscydmus lynfieldi	insect	Lynfield	Currently the species had only been identified in the vicinity of Lynfield.
	stitchbird, hihi	Notiomystis cincta	bird	New Zealand	Historically common across New Zealand, by the 20th century had become restricted to Little Barrier Island. Since 1991, the species has been reintroduced to islands and sanctuaries.
	Jacinda's barnacle lichen	Ocellularia jacinda-arderniae	lichen	Auckland Region	Found growing primarily on coastal tanekaha north and west of Auckland.
	pale flowered kūmarahou	Pomaderris hamiltonii	plant	Northland region, Rodney, Great Barrier Island, Pūkorokoro / Miranda	Found primarily around Pūkorokoro / Miranda in the Waikato Region, the Pouto Peninsula of Northland, around Warkworth, and on Great Barrier Island.
	Pycroft's petrel	Pterodroma pycrofti	bird	Hauraki Gulf	Has breeding sites across the Hauraki Gulf
		Pyrenula moniliformis	lichen	Auckland	Currently only known only to occur in the Auckland area, but theorised to be present in other regions.
		Ramalodium dumosum	lichen	Huia	Identified at one location near Huia, the lichen has since not been identified.
	New Zealand fairy tern, tara-iti	Sternula nereis davisae	bird	Northland region, Auckland region	One major breeding site in the Auckland region.
	northern hebe	Veronica obtusata	plant	Waitākere Ranges, Kawhia Harbour, Whāingaroa Harbour	Found primarily on steep slopes and banks, on cliff faces and rock stacks.
		Zelostemma thorpei	insect	Waitākere Ranges	Currently the species has only been identified around Huia and the northern shores of the Manukau Harbour.
