= Mamillariella =

Scientific classification
- Kingdom: Plantae
- Division: Bryophyta
- Class: Bryopsida
- Subclass: Bryidae
- Order: Hypnales
- Family: Leskeaceae
- Genus: Mamillariella

Genus of mosses

Mamillariella is a monotypic genus of moss in family Leskeaceae. It only contain one known species; Mamillariella geniculata, Laz.
