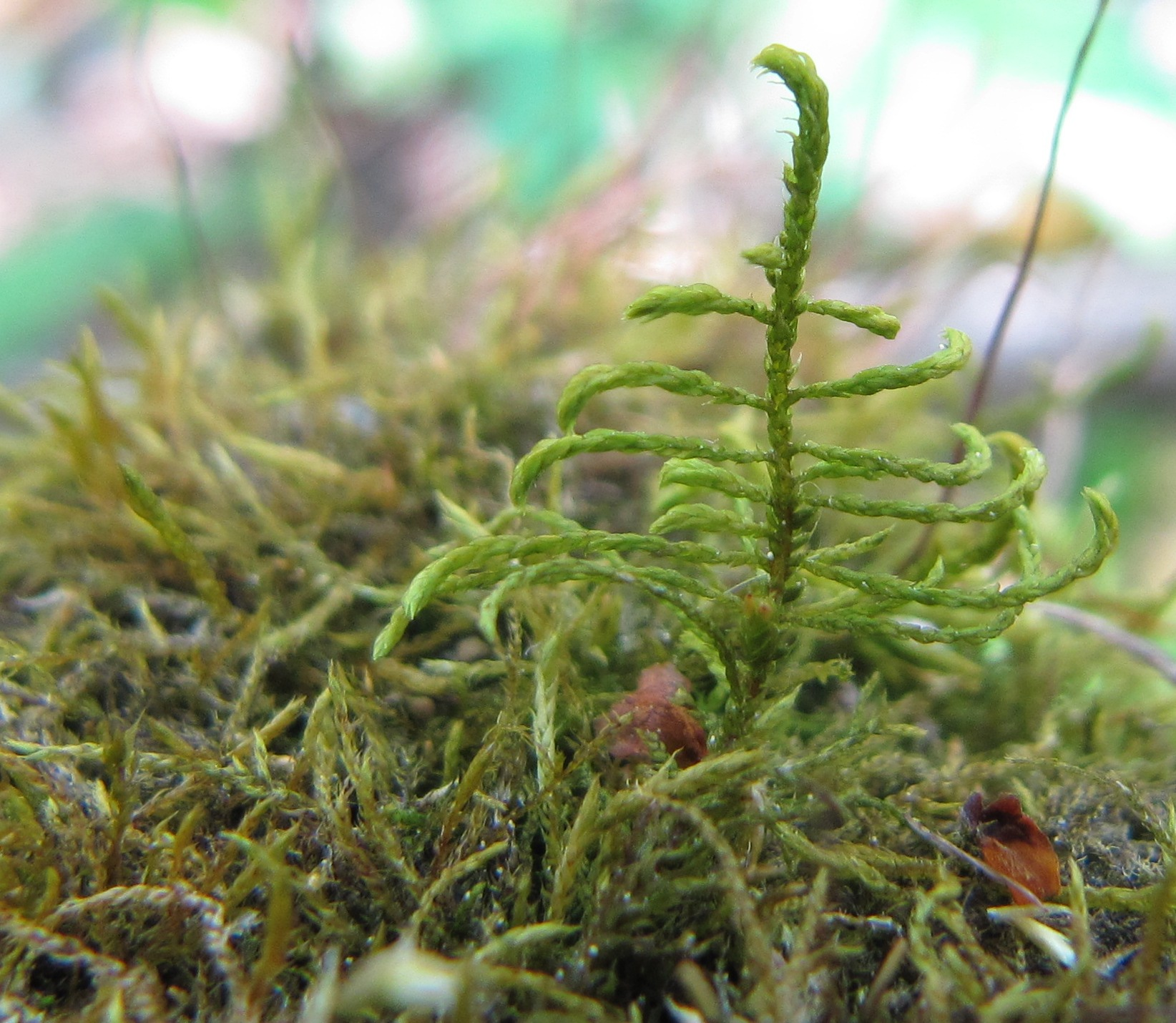
- Leskea polycarpa, in Denmark

Scientific classification
- Kingdom: Plantae
- Division: Bryophyta
- Class: Bryopsida
- Subclass: Bryidae
- Order: Hypnales
- Family: Leskeaceae
- Genus: Leskea; Hedw.

= Leskea =

Genus of mosses

Leskea is a genus of mosses belonging to the family Leskeaceae.

The genus has cosmopolitan distribution.

There are 112 species, including:

- Leskea abietina (Hedw.) Mitt.
- Leskea acidodon Mont.
- Leskea polycarpa Ehrh. ex Hedw.
