= Lindbergia geniculata =

Conservation status
- Endangered (IUCN 2.3)

Scientific classification
- Kingdom: Plantae
- Division: Bryophyta
- Class: Bryopsida
- Subclass: Bryidae
- Order: Hypnales
- Family: Leskeaceae
- Genus: Lindbergia
- Species: L. geniculata

Binomial name
- Lindbergia geniculata (Laz.) Ignatova & Ignatov

Synonyms
- Mamillariella geniculata Laz.

Species of moss

Lindbergia geniculata is a species of moss in the family Leskeaceae. It is endemic to Russia, where it is an endangered species known from only five to seven locations in the Russian Far East. It grows in deciduous forest habitat which is threatened by development.
