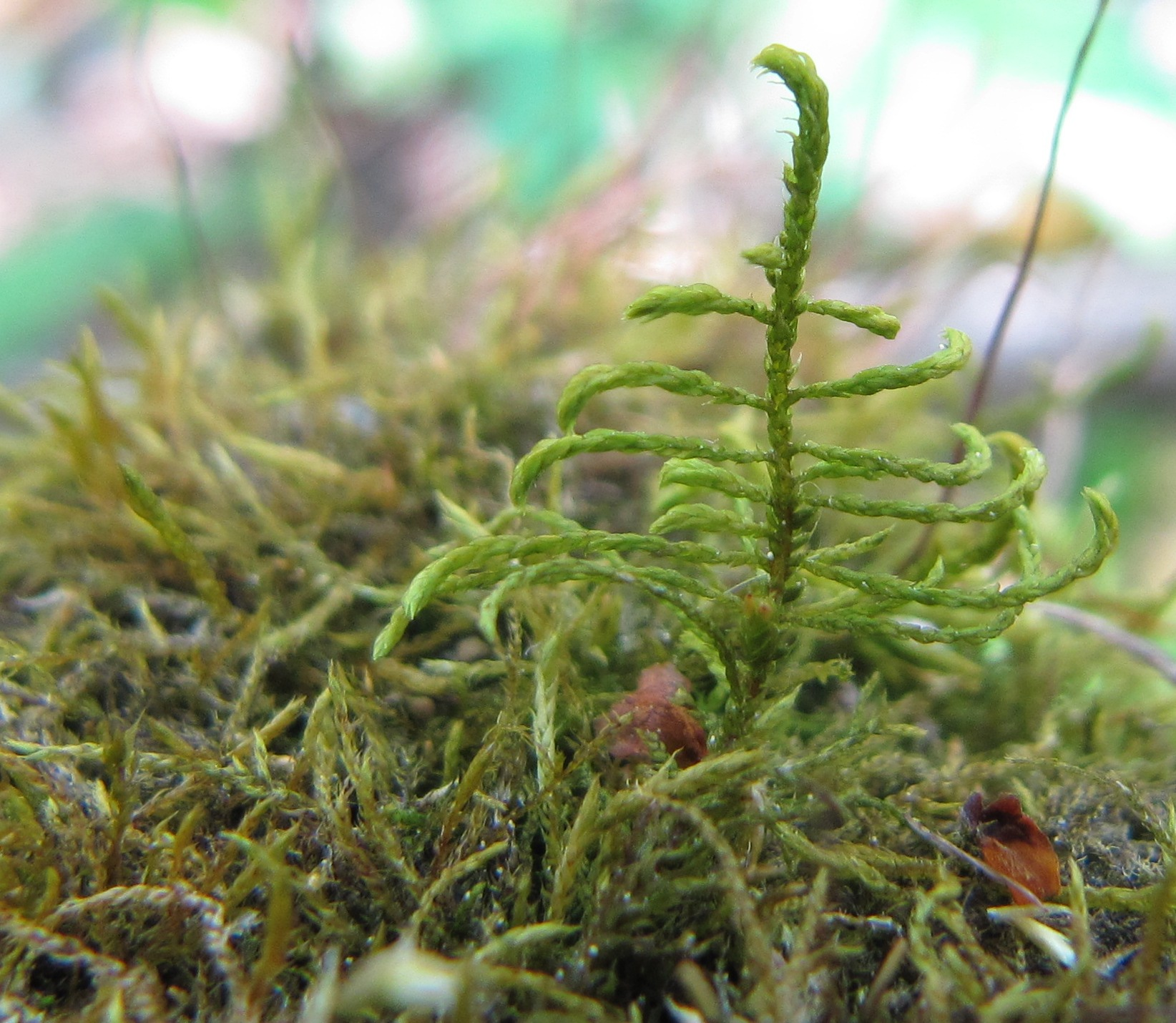

Scientific classification
- Kingdom: Plantae
- Division: Bryophyta
- Class: Bryopsida
- Subclass: Bryidae
- Order: Hypnales
- Family: Leskeaceae
- Genus: Leskea
- Species: L. polycarpa

Binomial name
- Leskea polycarpa Ehrh. ex Hedw.

= Leskea polycarpa =

Species of moss

Leskea polycarpa, commonly known as many-fruited leskea, is a species of moss belonging to the family Leskeaceae.

It is native to Eurasia and North America, usually found on the trunks and branches of trees near bodies of water, but also growing in dryer areas.

== Description ==
Leskea polycarpa has creeping stems with spreading branches. The leaves on the stem are longer than wide, about 0.8–1.6 mm (0.031–0.063 inches) long, while the branch leaves are about 0.5–0.8 mm (0.02–0.031 inches) in length and are ovate to lanceolate in shape. The spore capsules, 2–3 mm (0.079–0.118 inches) long, are brown to yellowish in colour, curved in shape; the seta (capsule stalk) is 7–12 mm (0.28–0.47 inches) long and can be red to brownish-orange.

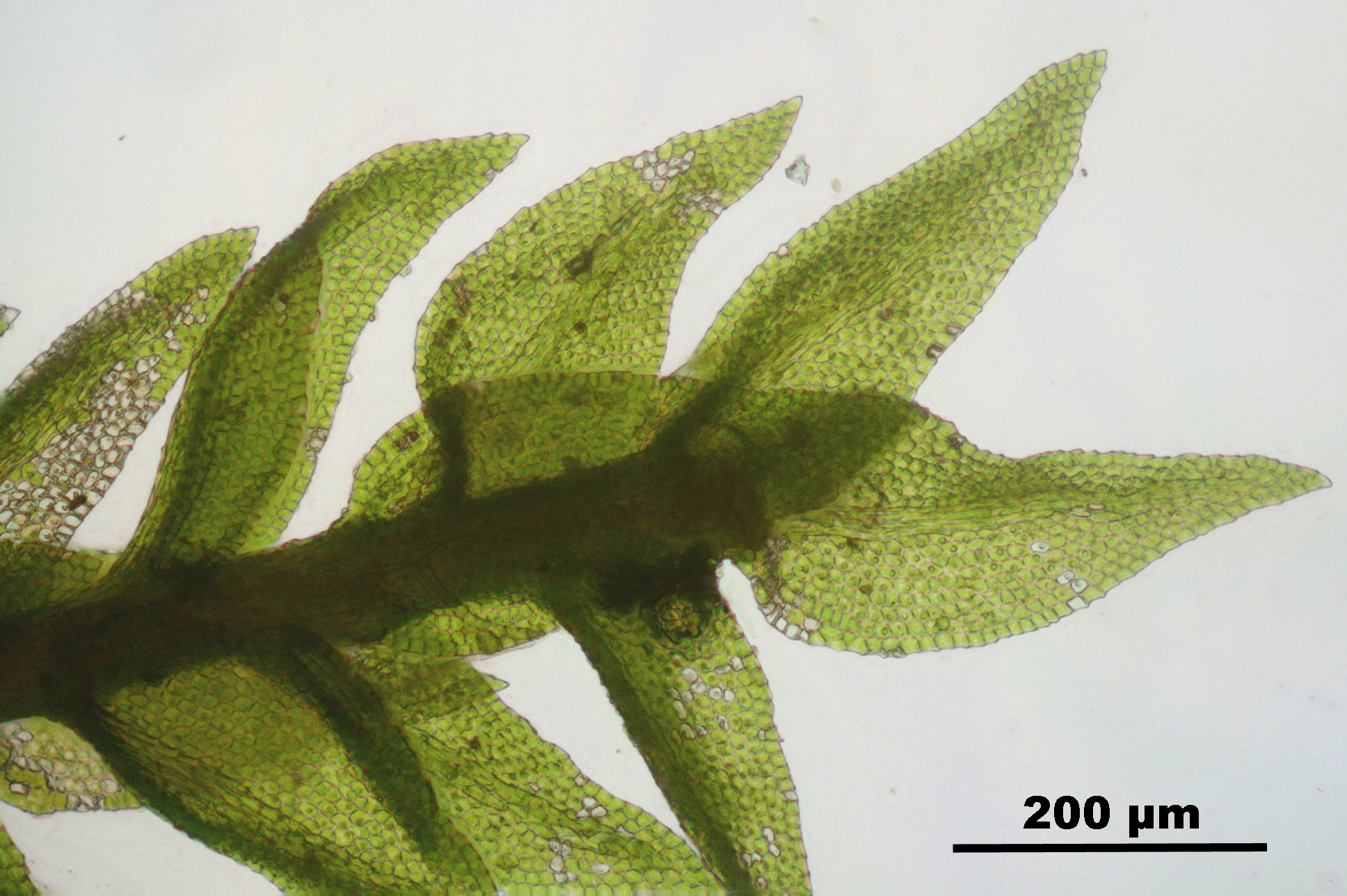
Leaves of Leskea polycarpa
