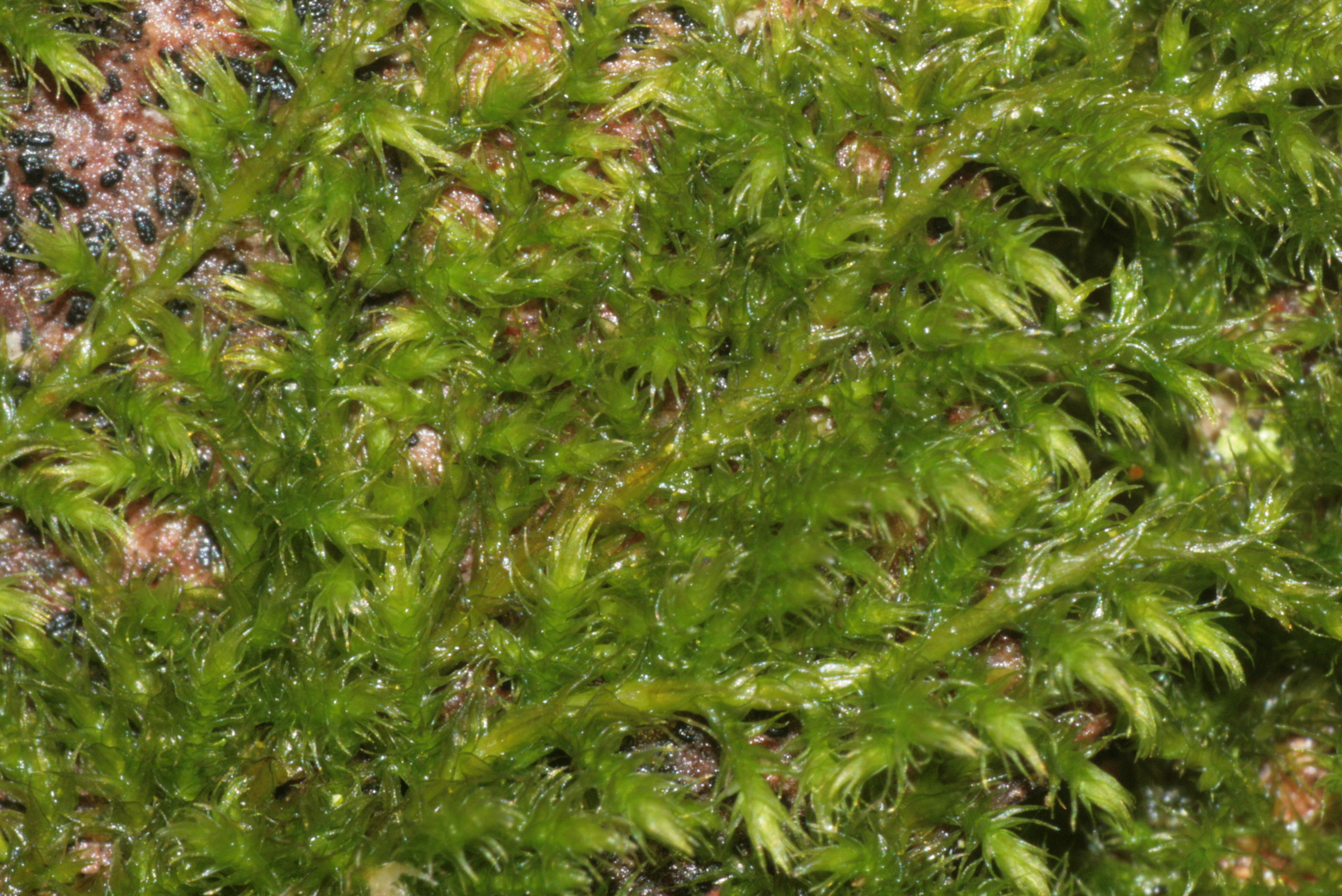
- Leskeella nervosa

Scientific classification
- Kingdom: Plantae
- Division: Bryophyta
- Class: Bryopsida
- Subclass: Bryidae
- Order: Hypnales
- Family: Leskeaceae
- Genus: Leskeella (Limpricht) Loeske, 1903

= Leskeella =

Genus of mosses

Leskeella is a genus of mosses in the family Leskeaceae.

== Species ==
Five species are recognized:

- Leskeella incrassata Brotherus, 1907
- Leskeella nervosa Loeske, 1903
- Leskeella pusilla Noguchi, 1972 [1973]
- Leskeella williamsii Grout, 1929
- Leskeella zuluensis Brotherus & Bryhn, 1911
