= Lindbergia maritima =

Conservation status
- Nationally Critical (NZ TCS)

Scientific classification
- Kingdom: Plantae
- Division: Bryophyta
- Class: Bryopsida
- Subclass: Bryidae
- Order: Hypnales
- Family: Leskeaceae
- Genus: Lindbergia
- Species: L. maritima

Binomial name
- Lindbergia maritima Lewinsky
- Known native range

Species of plant

Lindbergia maritima is a species of moss in the family Leskeaceae. The species is endemic to New Zealand, occurring at only a single rocky coastal location near Piha, in the Auckland Region, New Zealand.

== Taxonomy ==
The moss species was first described by Danish botanist Jette Lewinsky in 1977, after visiting Piha in 1974. At the time, the species was the first member of Lindbergia with papillose leaf cells to be described in the Southern Hemisphere. The species epithet maritima refers to the species shoreside habitat.

== Description ==
Lindbergia maritima is a small and slender moss that forms dark green or brown mats on coastal rocks. It has stems of between 10–15 mm (0.39–0.59 in) in height. The leaves of the species spread when moist.

== Distribution and habitat ==
The species is endemic to New Zealand, known from a single location at Piha in West Auckland on the coast of the Tasman Sea. The species grows exclusively on coastal andesite pebble breccia. The amount of L. maritima found at the site significantly decreased between the 1970s and 2000s, potentially due to increased westerly wave actions. This places the species at imminent threat of extinction.
