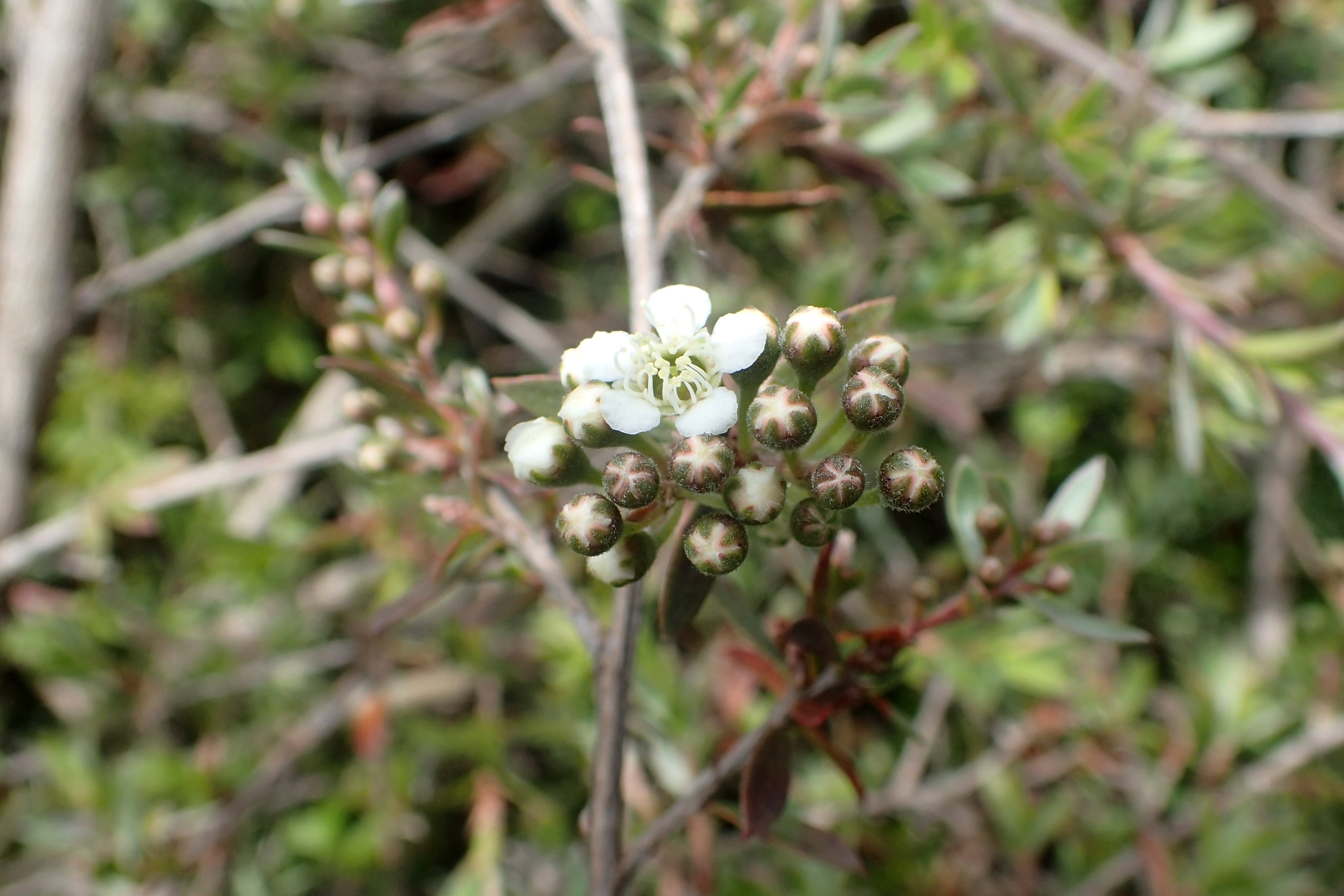
- Kunzea sinclairii at the Auckland Botanic Gardens

Conservation status
- Nationally Critical (NZ TCS)

Scientific classification
- Kingdom: Plantae
- Clade: Tracheophytes
- Clade: Angiosperms
- Clade: Eudicots
- Clade: Rosids
- Order: Myrtales
- Family: Myrtaceae
- Genus: Kunzea
- Species: K. sinclairii

Binomial name
- Kunzea sinclairii (Kirk) W.Harris
- Known native range

Synonyms
- Leptospermum sinclairii Kirk, 1899

= Kunzea sinclairii =

Species of flowering plant

Kunzea sinclairii, also known as the Great Barrier Island kānuka, is a flowering plant in the myrtle family, Myrtaceae and is endemic to Great Barrier Island in the Auckland Region, New Zealand.

== Taxonomy and naming ==
Kunzea sinclairii was first formally described in 1899 by British botanist Thomas Kirk, who named the species Leptospermum sinclairii. Kirk named the species after Andrew Sinclair, who he believed had originally discovered the plant. Kirk visited Great Barrier Island in late 1867, during which time he likely collected specimens of the plant. In 1983, Australian botanist Joy Thompson revised the genus Leptospermum, transferring the species within the genus Kunzea. A new combination was published in 1987, making the plant's currently accepted name Kunzea sinclairii.

== Description ==
Kirk's original type description of the species is as follows:

Stems prostrate or suberect, 1 ft (0.30 m).-3 ft (0.91 m). high, spreading; young shoots and leaves white with loosely appressed silky hairs. Leaves linear-lanceolate or oblong-lanceolate, flat or concave. Flowers larger and pedicels longer than in L. ericoides, crowded, fasciculate or umbellate. Pedicels and calyx-tube silky, villous; calyx-tube narrow-turbinate; lobes oblong, subacute or rounded. Petals obovate. Ovary deeply sunk within the calyx-tube; style slender. Fruiting calyx-tube campanulate, silky.

Kirk notes that the species is similar to K. ericoides, but the two species can be told apart due to the larger flowers of K. sinclairii, as well as the "white silky leaves" and because the "ovary is sunk fully one-third below the narrow calyx-tube, while the sepals and petals are narrower, and the style is extremely slender".

The species typically grows into a wide-spreading shrub, however on occasion can grow into a tree that can reach as tall as 6 m (20 ft).

== Hybridisation ==
The species has been known to form a hybrid with K. linearis. Kunzea linearis × Kunzea sinclairii has been found on the western shores of Great Barrier Island. The species has also been known to hybridise with Leptospermum scoparium (mānuka), and with K. robusta.

== Distribution and habitat ==
This kunzea is endemic to Great Barrier Island in the Auckland Region, New Zealand. It thrives in rocky tors, cliffs and gorges, usually dominating rocky habitats on the island. K. sinclairii is estimated to cover 90.5 ha (224 acres) or 0.3% of the total land area of Great Barrier Island.

== Conservation status ==
Kunzea sinclairii is listed as "threatened – nationally critical" under the New Zealand threat classification series 3.

== Gallery ==
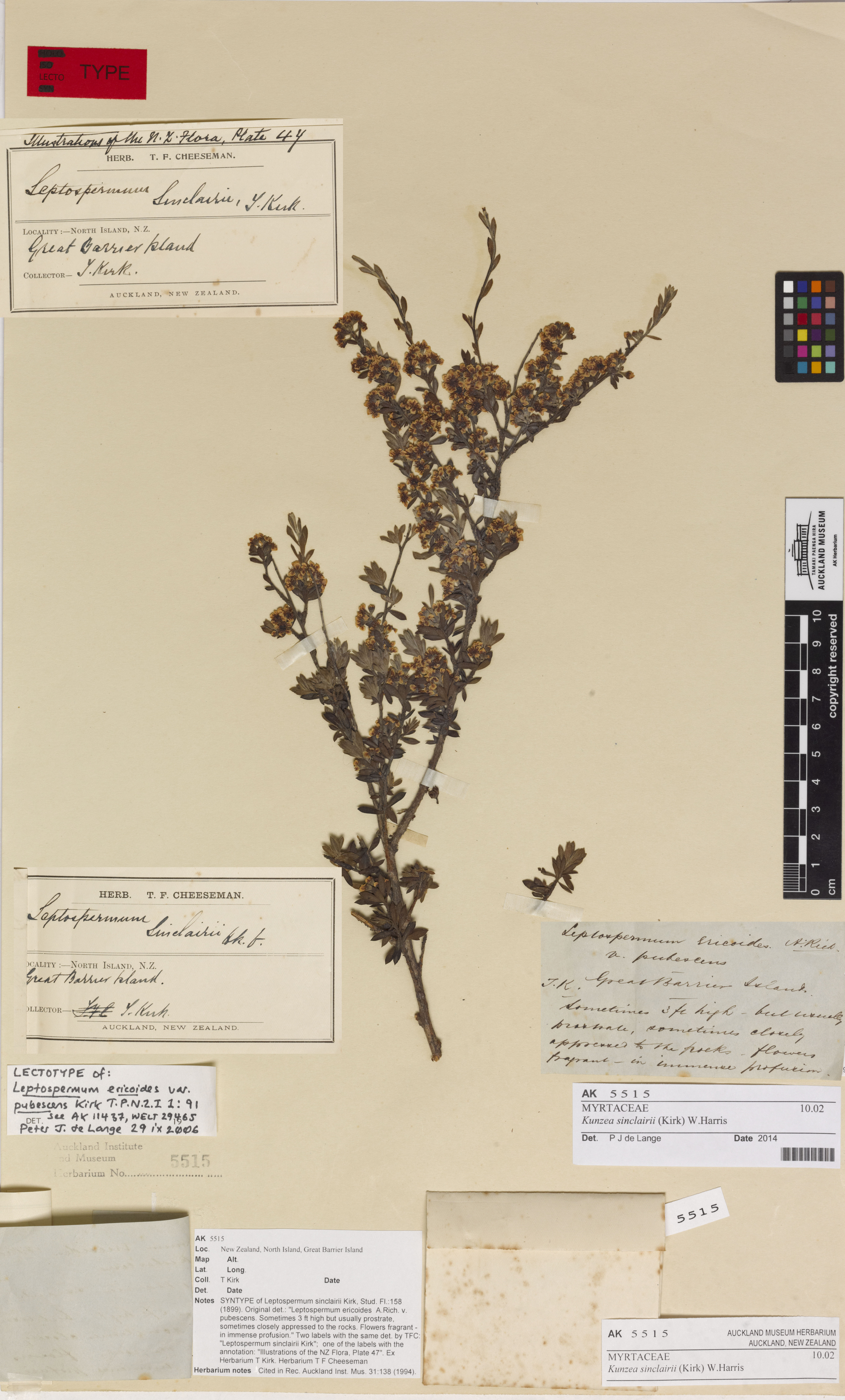
Lectotype of K. sinclairii from the Auckland War Memorial Museum herbarium

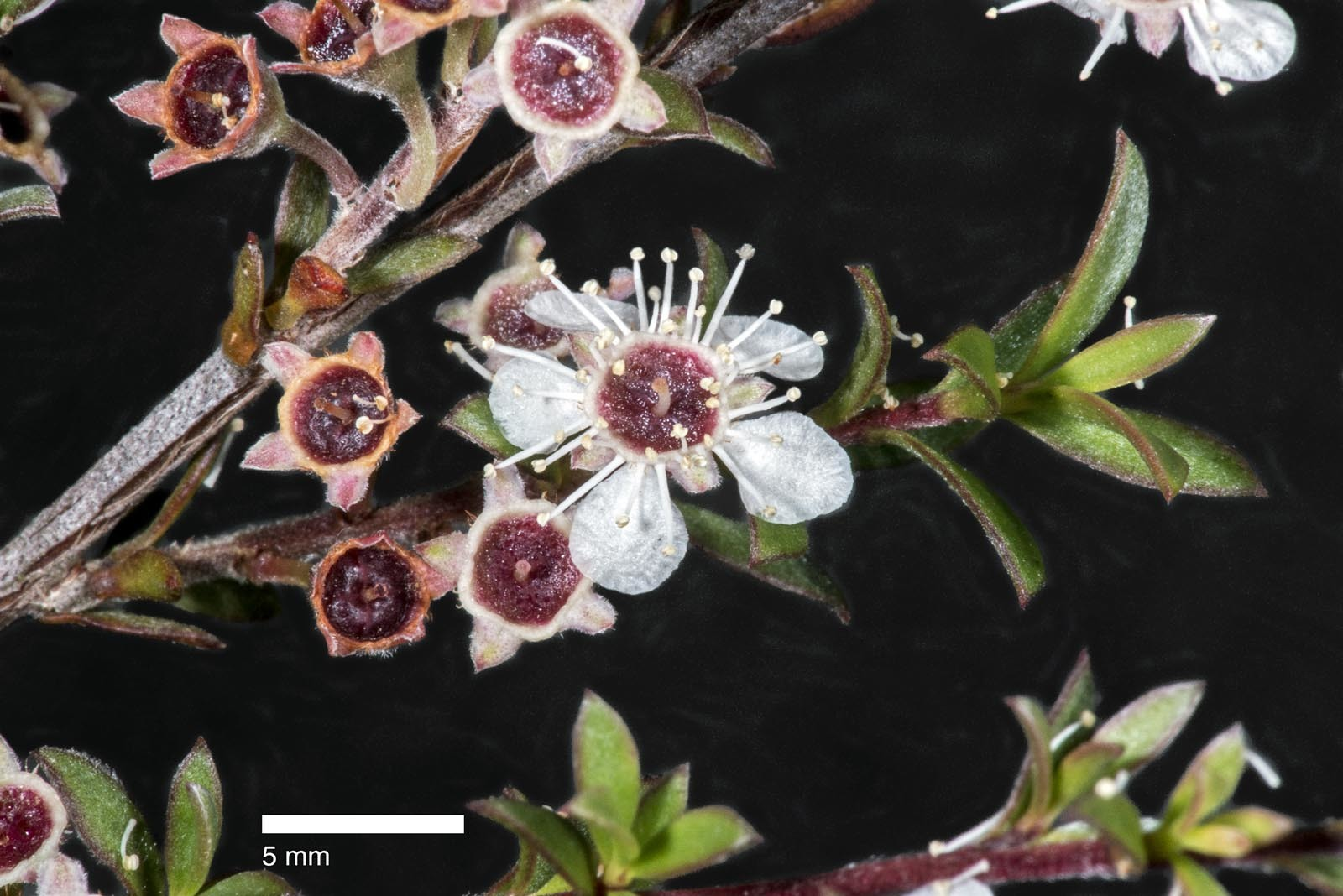
Flowers of K. sinclairii

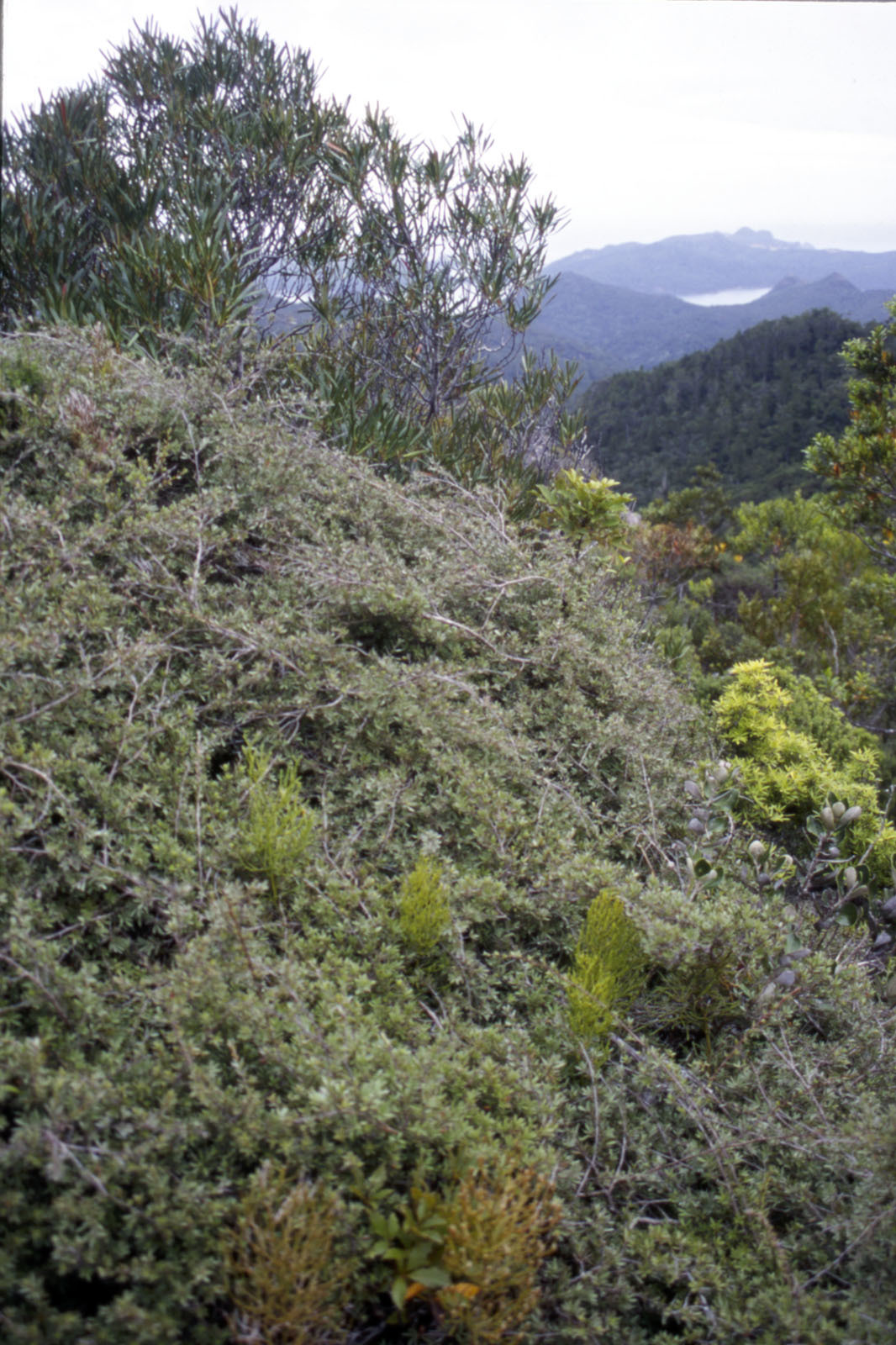
K. sinclairii growing in a rocky canyon on Great Barrier Island
