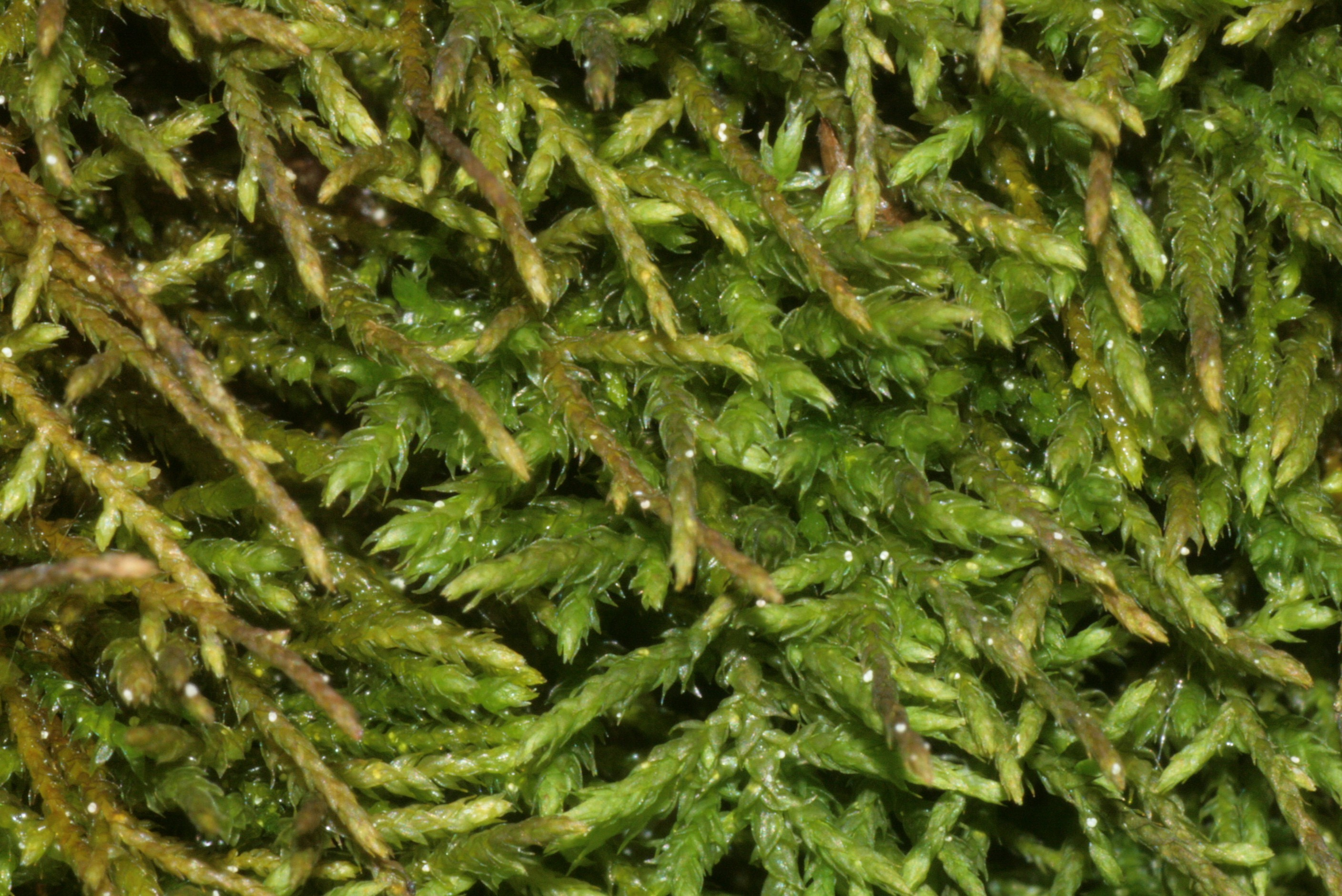
- Pseudoleskeella catenulata

Scientific classification
- Kingdom: Plantae
- Division: Bryophyta
- Class: Bryopsida
- Subclass: Bryidae
- Order: Hypnales
- Family: Leskeaceae
- Genus: Pseudoleskeella; Kindb.

= Pseudoleskeella =

Genus of mosses

Pseudoleskeella is a genus of mosses belonging to the family Leskeaceae.

The species of this genus are found predominantly in Northern Hemisphere.

Species:

- Pseudoleskeella catenulata Kindberg, 1897
- Pseudoleskeella denticulata (Sull.) Kindb.
