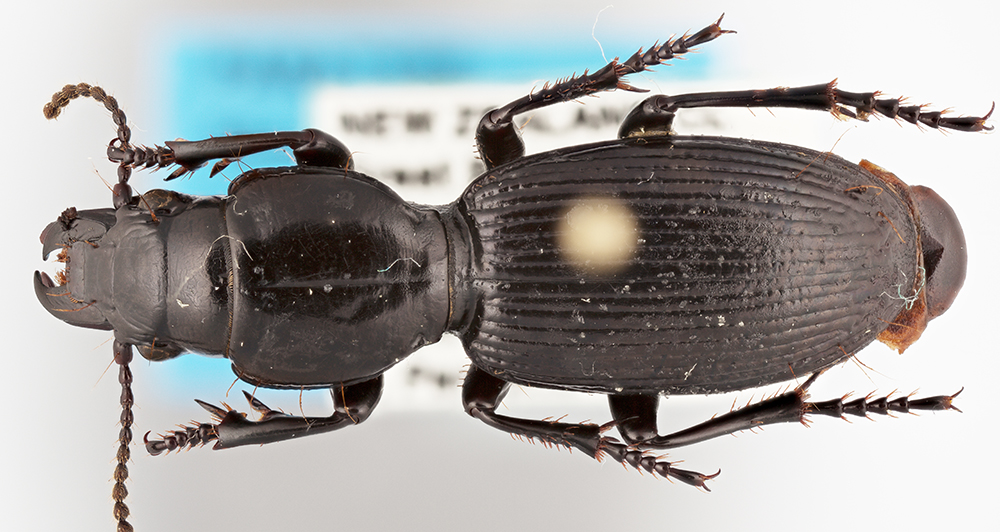

Conservation status
- Naturally Uncommon (NZ TCS)

Scientific classification
- Kingdom: Animalia
- Phylum: Arthropoda
- Class: Insecta
- Order: Coleoptera
- Suborder: Adephaga
- Family: Carabidae
- Genus: Mecodema
- Species: M. aoteanoho

Binomial name
- Mecodema aoteanoho Seldon & Leschen, 2011
- Known native range

= Mecodema aoteanoho =

Species of beetle

Mecodema aoteanoho is a medium-sized (19–24 mm length, 5.5–7 mm width) ground beetle, the only such beetle endemic to Great Barrier Island (Aotea), Hauraki Gulf, Auckland, New Zealand. Mecodema aoteanoho is a sister species to M. haunoho (Little Barrier Island) and is closely related to the Coromandel (mainland) species, M. atrox, all of which are species within the monophyletic curvidens group (4–6 setae along each side of the prothoracic carina). There are a number of other characters that distinguish M. aoteanoho from all other North Island Mecodema, especially the pattern of the striations on the elytra.

For a detailed description of M. aoteanoho see Seldon & Buckley 2019.

== Description ==
Mecodema aoteanoho is dull to shiny black in colour. They are flightless: in fact they have no wings under the sutured elytra (wing cases).

== Natural history ==
Little is known about the life cycle of Mecodema in general.

They are nocturnal predators and scavengers, feeding on a range of ground and soil-dwelling invertebrates in the native broadleaf forests of Aotea.

== Conservation status ==
Under the New Zealand Threat Classification System, this species is listed as "Naturally Uncommon" with the qualifiers of "Island Endemic" and "One Location".
