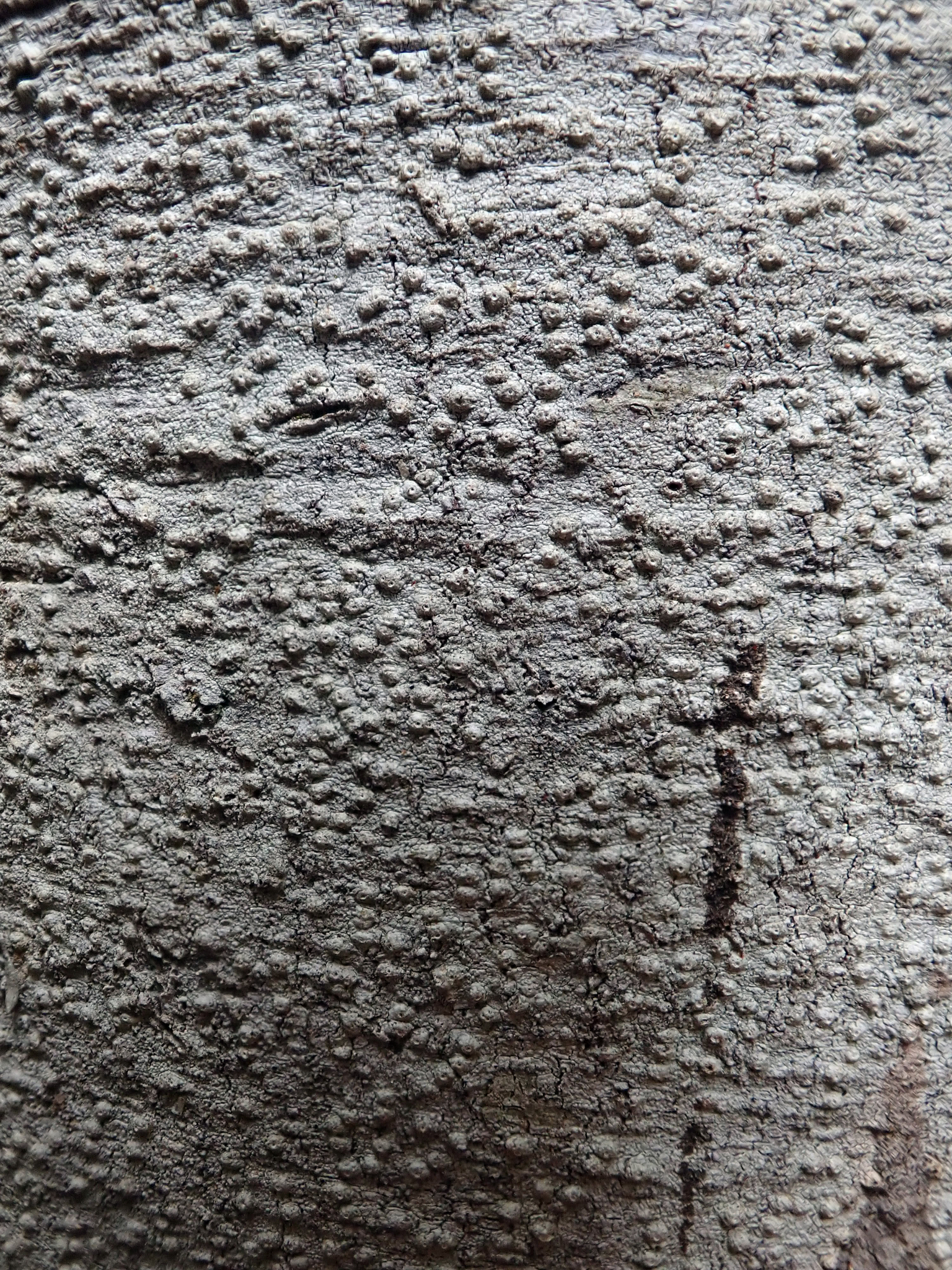
- on the bark of tanekaha at Kendall Bay, Auckland

Scientific classification
- Domain: Eukaryota
- Kingdom: Fungi
- Division: Ascomycota
- Class: Lecanoromycetes
- Order: Graphidales
- Family: Graphidaceae
- Genus: Ocellularia
- Species: O. jacinda-arderniae

Binomial name
- Ocellularia jacinda-arderniae A.J.Marshall, Blanchon, Lücking et de Lange

= Ocellularia jacinda-arderniae =

Species of lichen

Ocellularia jacinda-arderniae, known by the common name Jacinda's barnacle lichen, is a species of lichen in the family Graphidaceae. Endemic to New Zealand, it is part of the Ocellularia bicuspidata species complex. It was first described in 2019 by Andrew J. Marshall, Dan Blanchon, Robert Lücking and Peter de Lange, who named the species after New Zealand prime minister Jacinda Ardern.

== Description ==
The species is white to pale grey in colour, and had a discontinuous algal layer, with scattered or clumped crystals of calcium oxalate. It can be differentiated from Ocellularia bicuspidata by having a coarsely verrucose thallus, no marginal rim on sessile ascomata, and non-septate ascospore appendages.

== Taxonomy ==
The species was first described by Andrew J. Marshall, Dan Blanchon, Robert Lücking and Peter de Lange in 2019, who named the species after New Zealand prime minister Jacinda Ardern. The species was first recognised and collected in 2018, and the type specimen was collected in 2019 from the trunk of a tanekaha tree growing near the shores of the eastern Kaipara Harbour near Glorit in Auckland, New Zealand, by Dan Blanchon and P.J. Edmonds, and is kept at the Unitec Institute of Technology herbarium.

== Ecology ==
Ocellularia jacinda-arderniae is a part of the Ocellularia bicuspidata species complex. It primarily grows on tanekaha, and has also been identified on kauri, mapou, rewarewa, and toru.

== Distribution ==
The species is known to occur in regenerating coastal forest dominated by kauri and tanekaha in the Auckland region.

== Gallery ==
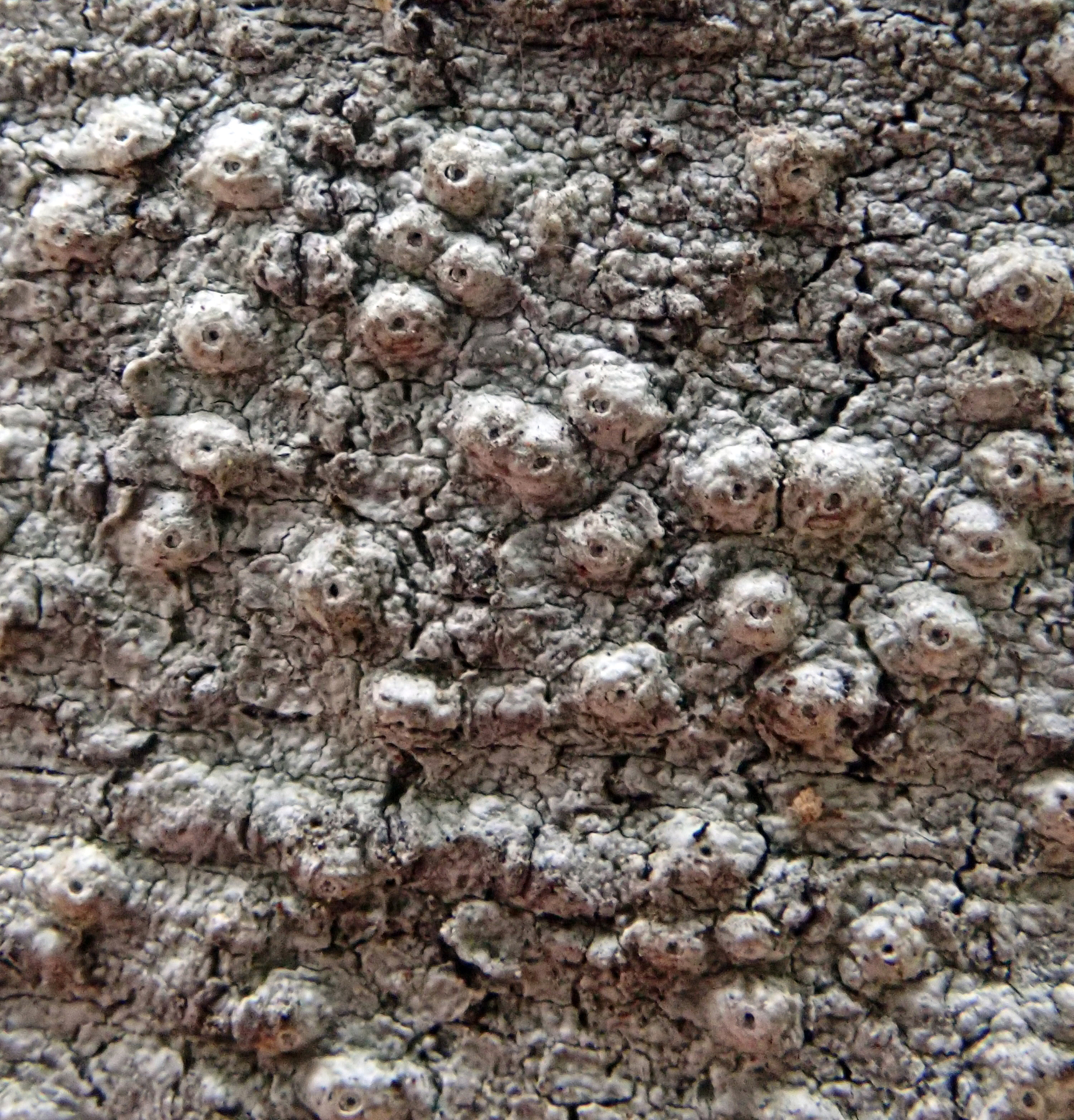

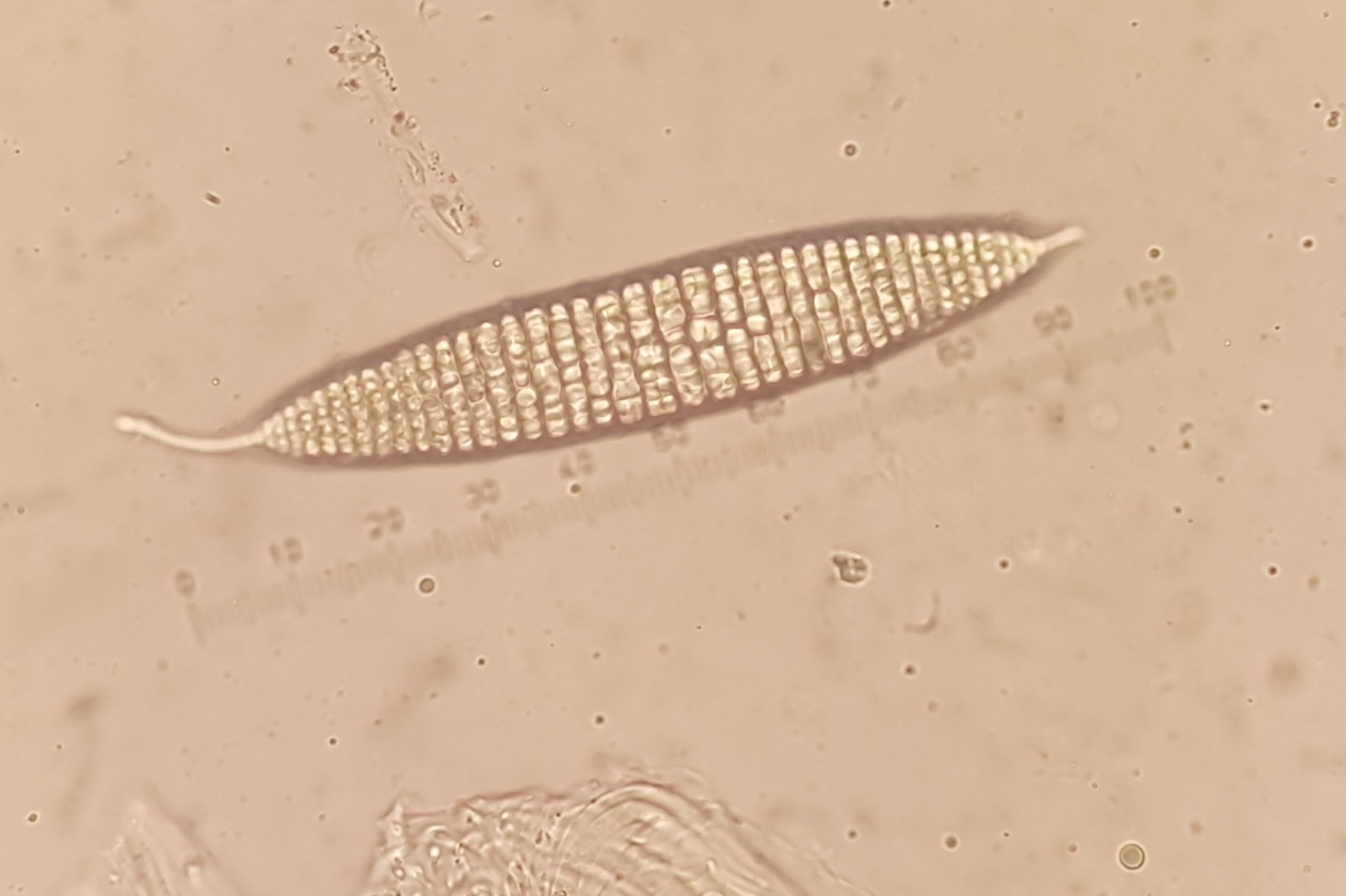

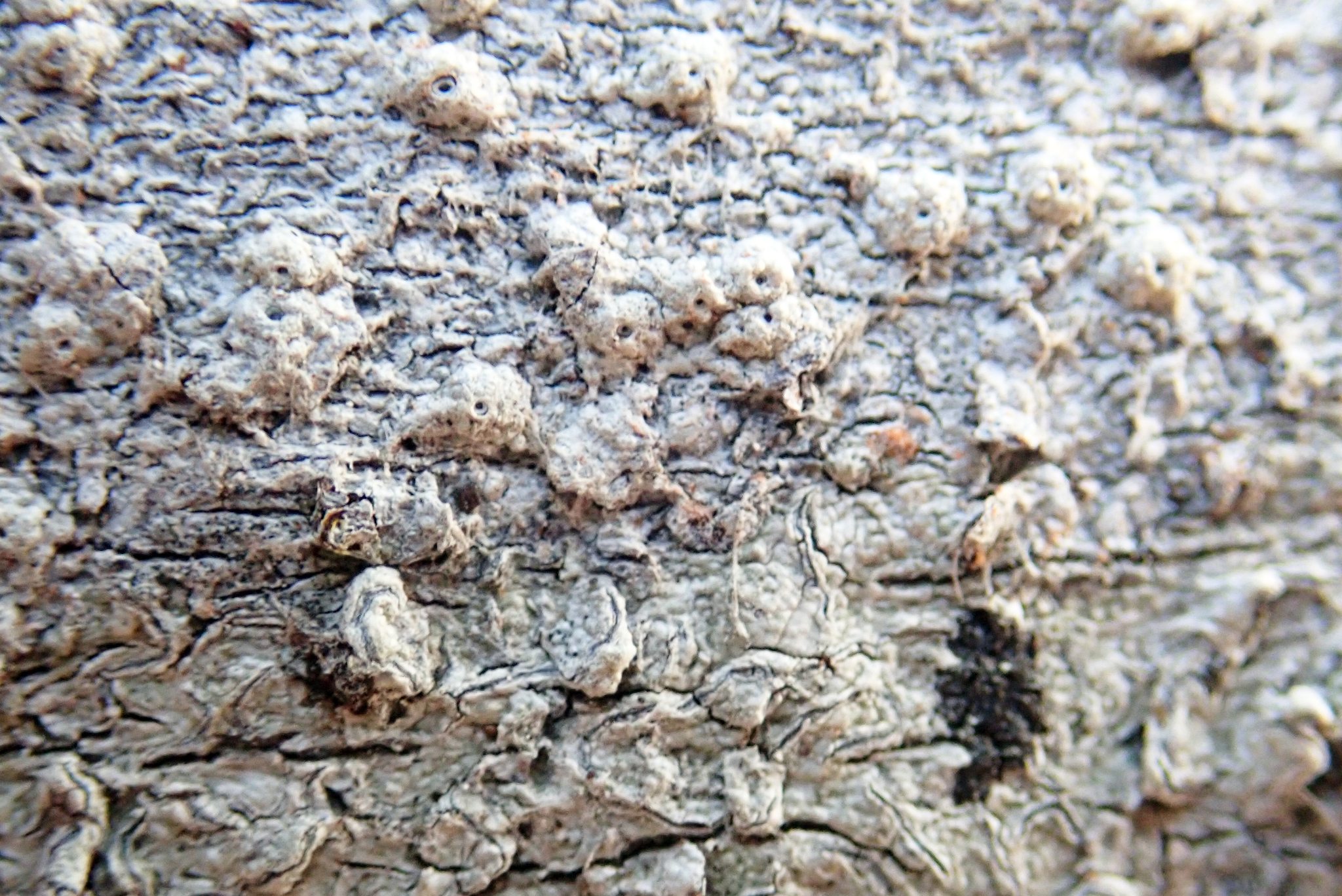
