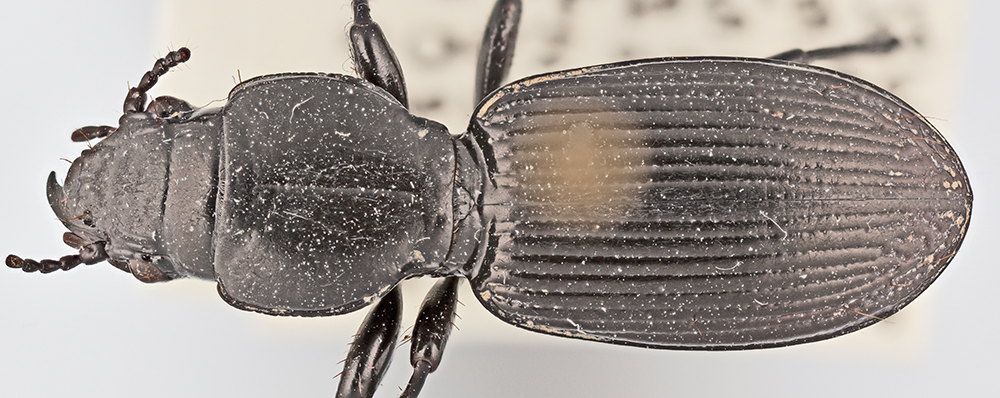
- Dorsal view of Mecodema haunoho from Little Barrier Island, New Zealand

Conservation status
- Naturally Uncommon (NZ TCS)

Scientific classification
- Kingdom: Animalia
- Phylum: Arthropoda
- Class: Insecta
- Order: Coleoptera
- Suborder: Adephaga
- Family: Carabidae
- Genus: Mecodema
- Species: M. haunoho

Binomial name
- Mecodema haunoho Seldon & Leschen, 2011
- Distribution (in green) of Mecodema haunoho

= Mecodema haunoho =

Species of beetle

Mecodema haunoho is the only ground beetle (Carabidae) species that is endemic to Little Barrier Island (Hauturu). It is sister species of the Great Barrier Island (Aotea) species M. aoteanoho and both are closely related to M. manaia, a species found in Bream Head, Northland, New Zealand.

== Diagnosis ==
Distinguished from other North Island Mecodema species by having:

1. the prothoracic carina narrow the entire length, moderately crenulated with 3 setae along each side (curvidens species group);
2. the distinctive shape of the penis lobe.

== Description ==
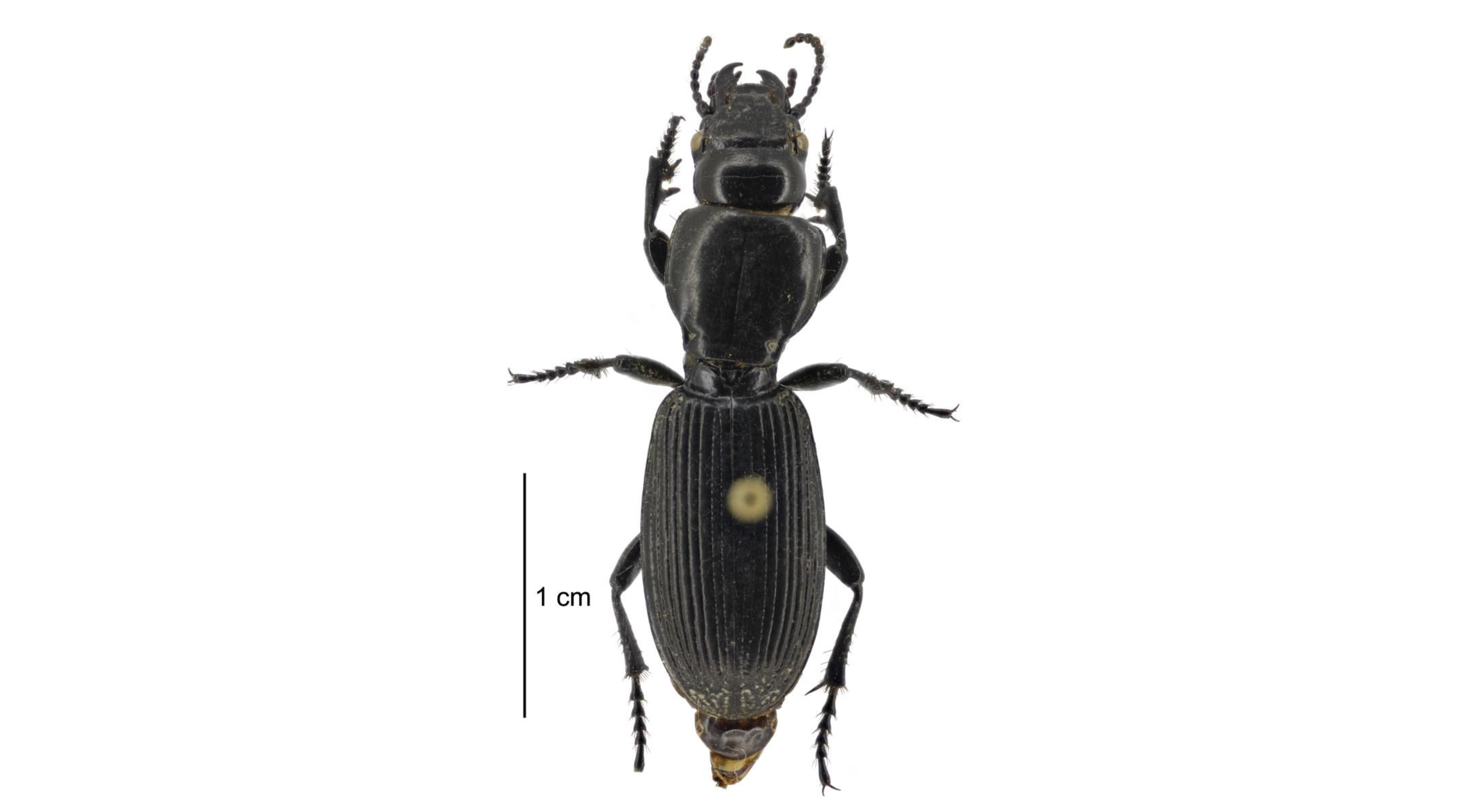
Holotype specimen

Length 20.5–24.1 mm, pronotal width 5.1–5.9 mm, elytral width 6.3–6.8 mm. Colour of the entire body is matte to glossy black.

== Natural history ==
Found throughout the island, but more commonly encountered in the broadleaf forests of the southern and southwestern areas of Hauturu.

== Conservation status ==
Under the New Zealand Threat Classification System, this species is listed as "Naturally Uncommon" with the qualifiers of "Island Endemic" and "One Location".
