= Riverhead Forest =

Forest in Auckland, New Zealand

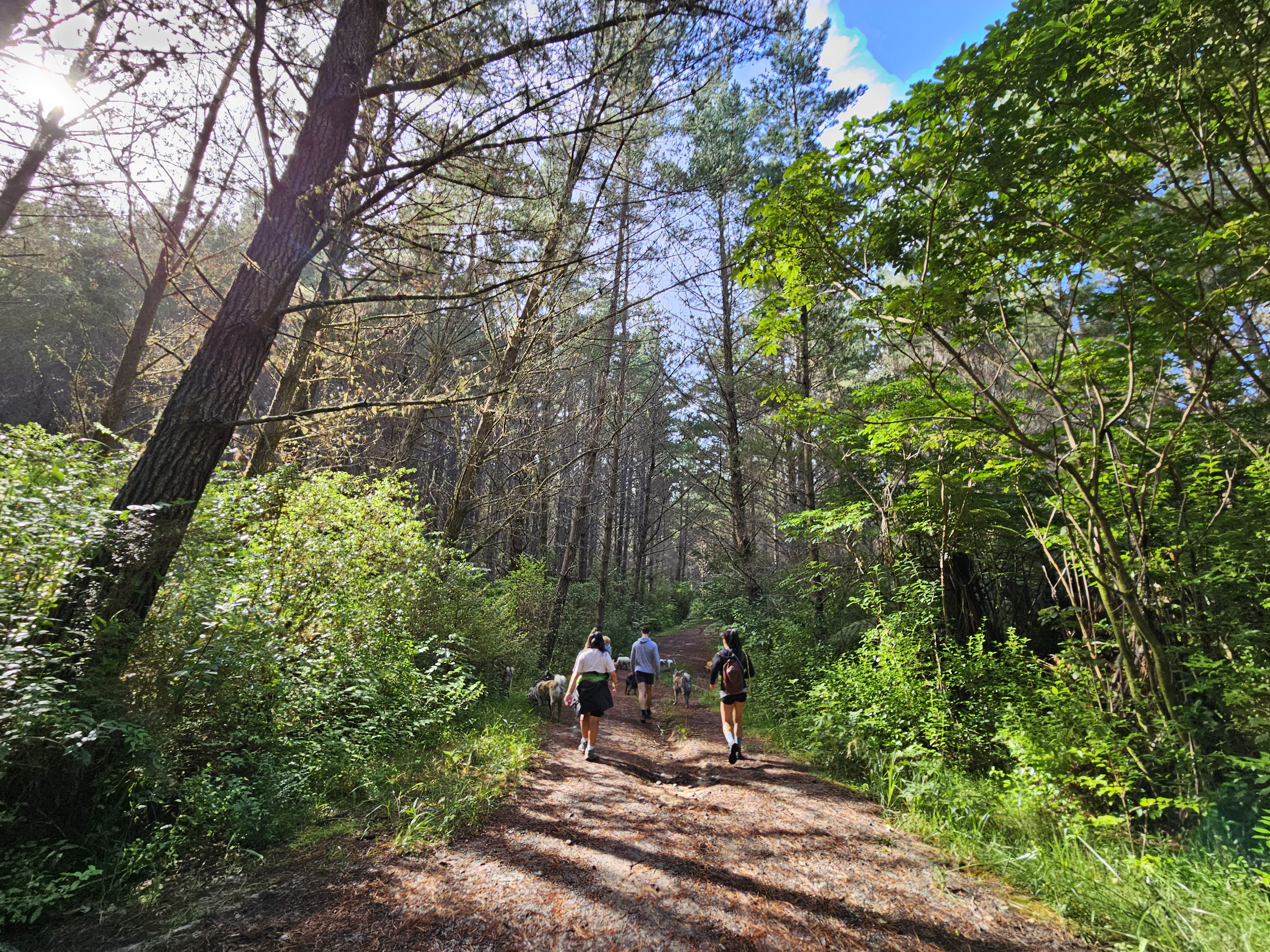
- Riverhead Forest, a predominantly Pinus radiata forest, is a popular location for outdoor recreation
- Interactive map of Riverhead Forest
- Coordinates: 36°42′45″S 174°34′30″E

Riverhead Forest is a former state-owned forest to the north-west of Auckland, New Zealand. Originally a kauri-dense native forest, the area was logged and the soil dug for kauri gum during the Colonial Era of New Zealand. In the 1920s, the area was designated as a state forest where Pinus radiata was grown. The forest is known for its recreational pursuits, including paintball, horse trekking and hunting. Most of the forest has now been returned to iwi ownership through the Treaty settlement process.

== Geography ==
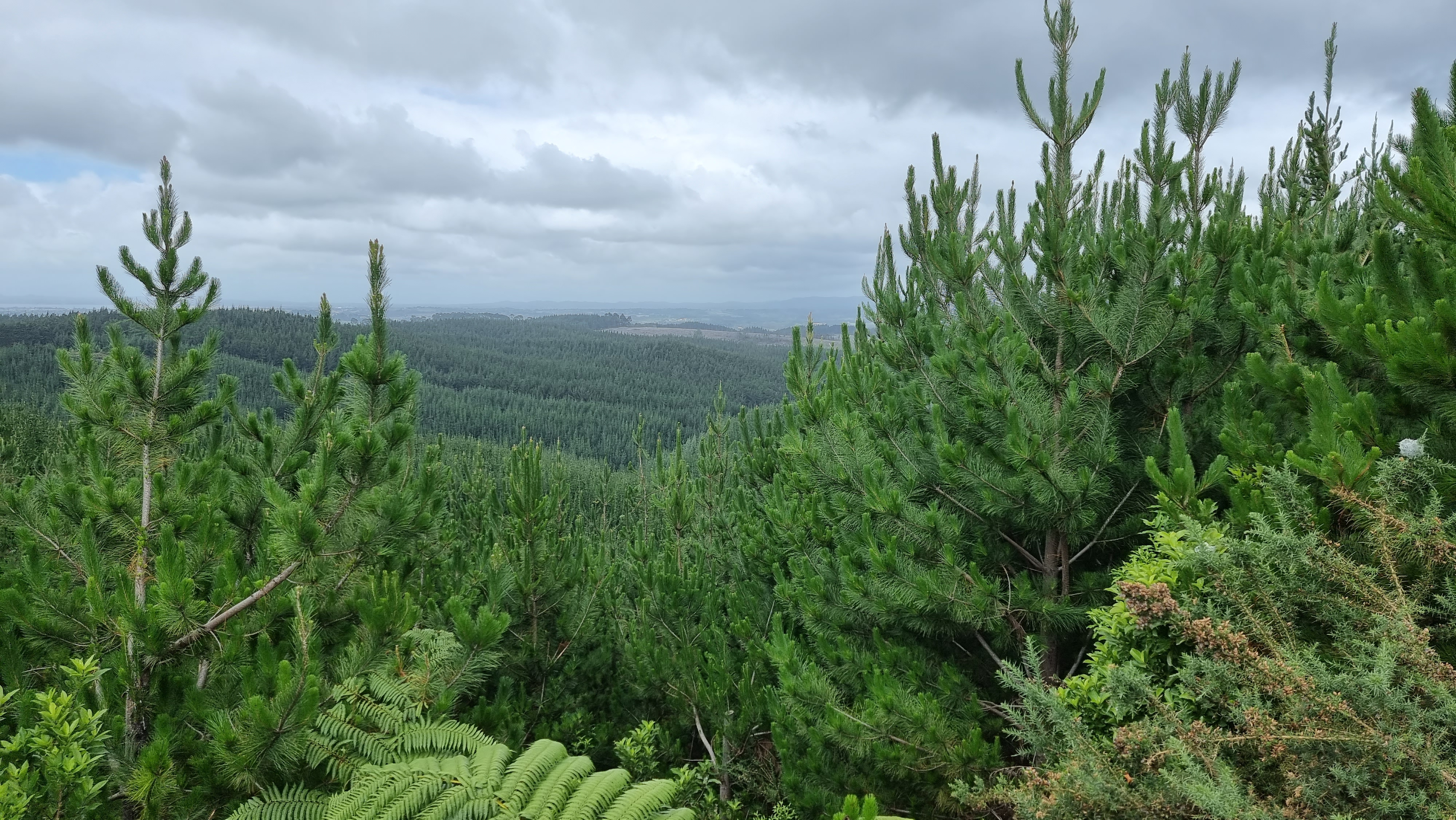
Pinus radiata trees growing in Riverhead Forest

The forest is 4,846 hectares in size. The forest is bordered by the Auckland townships of Huapai, Kumeū and Riverhead to the south, and the affluent rural community of Coatesville to the east. To the north and west, the forest is bordered by rural areas of Rodney, including the vineyards of West Auckland. The forest is named after the township of Riverhead.

=== Climate ===
The coldest temperature recorded in the Auckland Region, −5.7 °C (21.7 °F) was recorded at Riverhead Forest in June 1936.

Climate data for Riverhead Forest (1960–1987 normals, extremes 1928–1987)
Month	Jan	Feb	Mar	Apr	May	Jun	Jul	Aug	Sep	Oct	Nov	Dec	Year
Record high °C (°F)	29.2 (84.6)	30.2 (86.4)	27.8 (82.0)	26.0 (78.8)	25.1 (77.2)	21.6 (70.9)	20.1 (68.2)	20.6 (69.1)	22.7 (72.9)	25.8 (78.4)	26.5 (79.7)	27.9 (82.2)	30.2 (86.4)
Mean maximum °C (°F)	26.9 (80.4)	27.0 (80.6)	25.9 (78.6)	23.6 (74.5)	20.7 (69.3)	18.6 (65.5)	17.7 (63.9)	18.0 (64.4)	19.4 (66.9)	21.3 (70.3)	23.5 (74.3)	25.6 (78.1)	27.7 (81.9)
Mean daily maximum °C (°F)	23.5 (74.3)	23.7 (74.7)	22.6 (72.7)	20.1 (68.2)	17.5 (63.5)	15.3 (59.5)	14.5 (58.1)	15.1 (59.2)	16.2 (61.2)	17.8 (64.0)	19.8 (67.6)	21.7 (71.1)	19.0 (66.2)
Daily mean °C (°F)	18.3 (64.9)	18.5 (65.3)	17.6 (63.7)	15.1 (59.2)	12.6 (54.7)	10.7 (51.3)	9.7 (49.5)	10.4 (50.7)	11.8 (53.2)	13.2 (55.8)	14.9 (58.8)	16.7 (62.1)	14.1 (57.4)
Mean daily minimum °C (°F)	13.0 (55.4)	13.3 (55.9)	12.5 (54.5)	10.1 (50.2)	7.7 (45.9)	6.0 (42.8)	5.0 (41.0)	5.8 (42.4)	7.4 (45.3)	8.6 (47.5)	10.1 (50.2)	11.7 (53.1)	9.3 (48.7)
Mean minimum °C (°F)	7.3 (45.1)	7.4 (45.3)	5.3 (41.5)	3.2 (37.8)	0.4 (32.7)	−1.2 (29.8)	−2.1 (28.2)	−1.1 (30.0)	0.5 (32.9)	1.8 (35.2)	3.3 (37.9)	5.6 (42.1)	−2.6 (27.3)
Record low °C (°F)	1.2 (34.2)	2.2 (36.0)	−0.8 (30.6)	−1.9 (28.6)	−2.8 (27.0)	−5.7 (21.7)	−5.0 (23.0)	−4.4 (24.1)	−2.9 (26.8)	−1.1 (30.0)	−1.7 (28.9)	−0.6 (30.9)	−5.7 (21.7)
Average rainfall mm (inches)	78.9 (3.11)	94.5 (3.72)	95.0 (3.74)	120.4 (4.74)	125.3 (4.93)	167.4 (6.59)	154.6 (6.09)	138.1 (5.44)	125.3 (4.93)	96.2 (3.79)	98.0 (3.86)	106.1 (4.18)	1,399.8 (55.12)
Source: NIWA

== History ==
The land was purchased from Ngāti Whātua in the mid-1800s. The future location of the Riverhead Forest was isolated, and so remained mostly unoccupied. Originally a native forest primarily consisting of kauri trees, the area was logged and kauri gum was dug from the soil. Gumdigging was profitable in the late 19th century and early 20th century, and at its peak there were 12 gumdigger camps in the Riverhead Forest area. In the early 20th century as transport connections to the area improved, there was greater public pressure to release the land for agriculture. In the 1920s, the New Zealand Government intended to divide the area into 36 allotments, as a part of the Riverhead Homestead Settlement scheme. In 1926, the land was designated as a production forest by the state, after the Commissioner of Crown Lands suggested the area for this use a year earlier. Private land within the forest borders was purchased by the state, and tree planting began in 1927, with most of the forest planted by 1933.

The first generation of pine trees failed, due to phosphate deficiency in the soil. After this was identified as an issue in the 1950s, the pine forest began to thrive. The findings at the Riverhead Forest were important for New Zealand forestry, as this led to forestry soils being tested to ensure a correct nutrient balance was available.

The forest was formerly owned by the New Zealand Government, and was administered by Carter Holt Harvey, which purchased tree cutting rights in 1990. Most of the forest land has now been vested in the ownership of Te Kawerau ā Maki through their treaty settlement. The forest license now sits with Rayonier Matariki Forests, which purchased Carter Holt Harvey's assets in 2005.

== Recreation ==
The forest is known for biking and horse trails. Riverhead Forest is host to events involving mountain bikers, four-wheel drive vehicles and dog sled drivers. The forest is also popular in winter months for hunters looking for wild pigs, and is the location of the longest running paintball field, which has been operating since 1985.

== Gallery ==
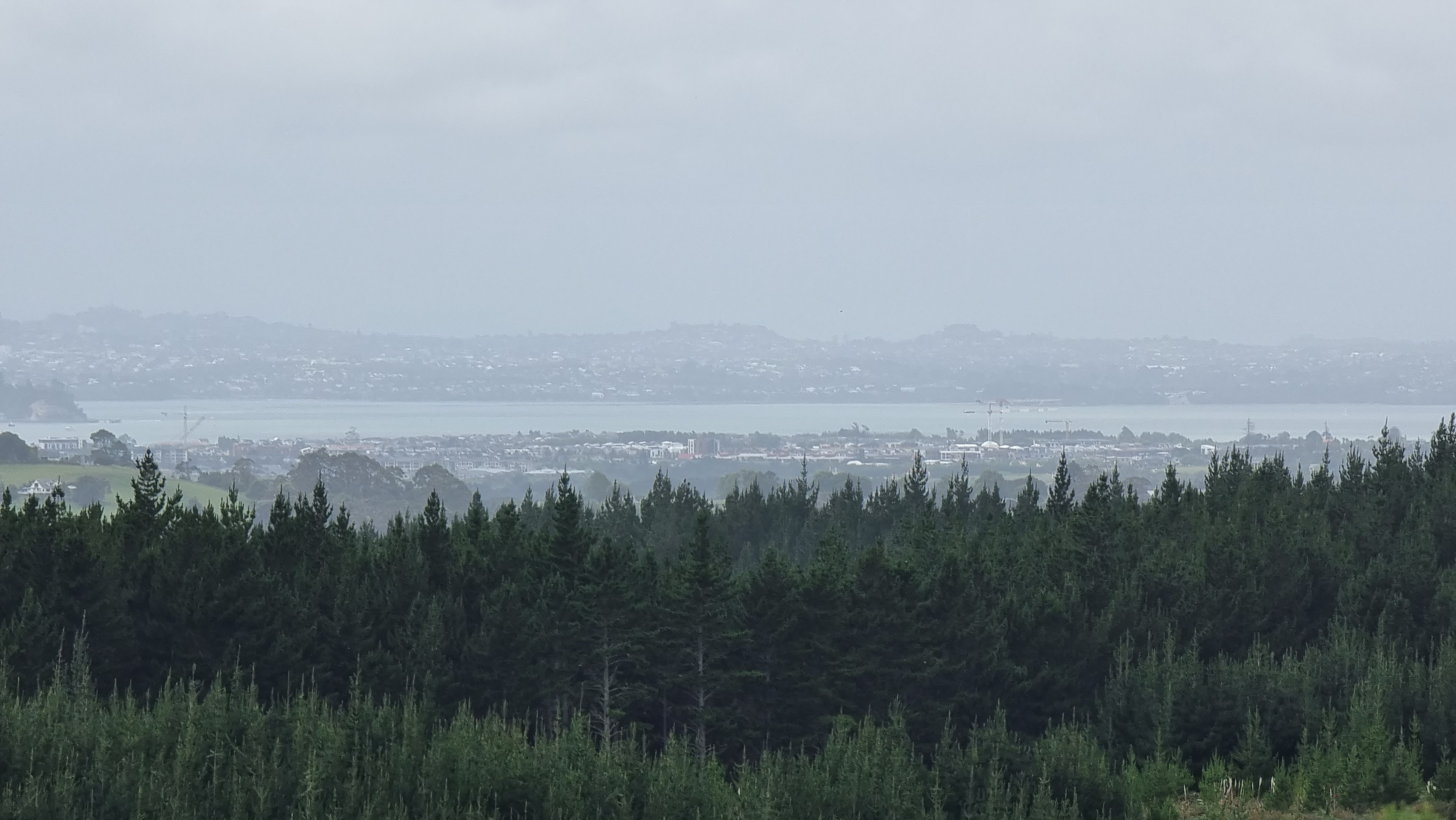
View of the Riverhead Forest looking south towards Auckland

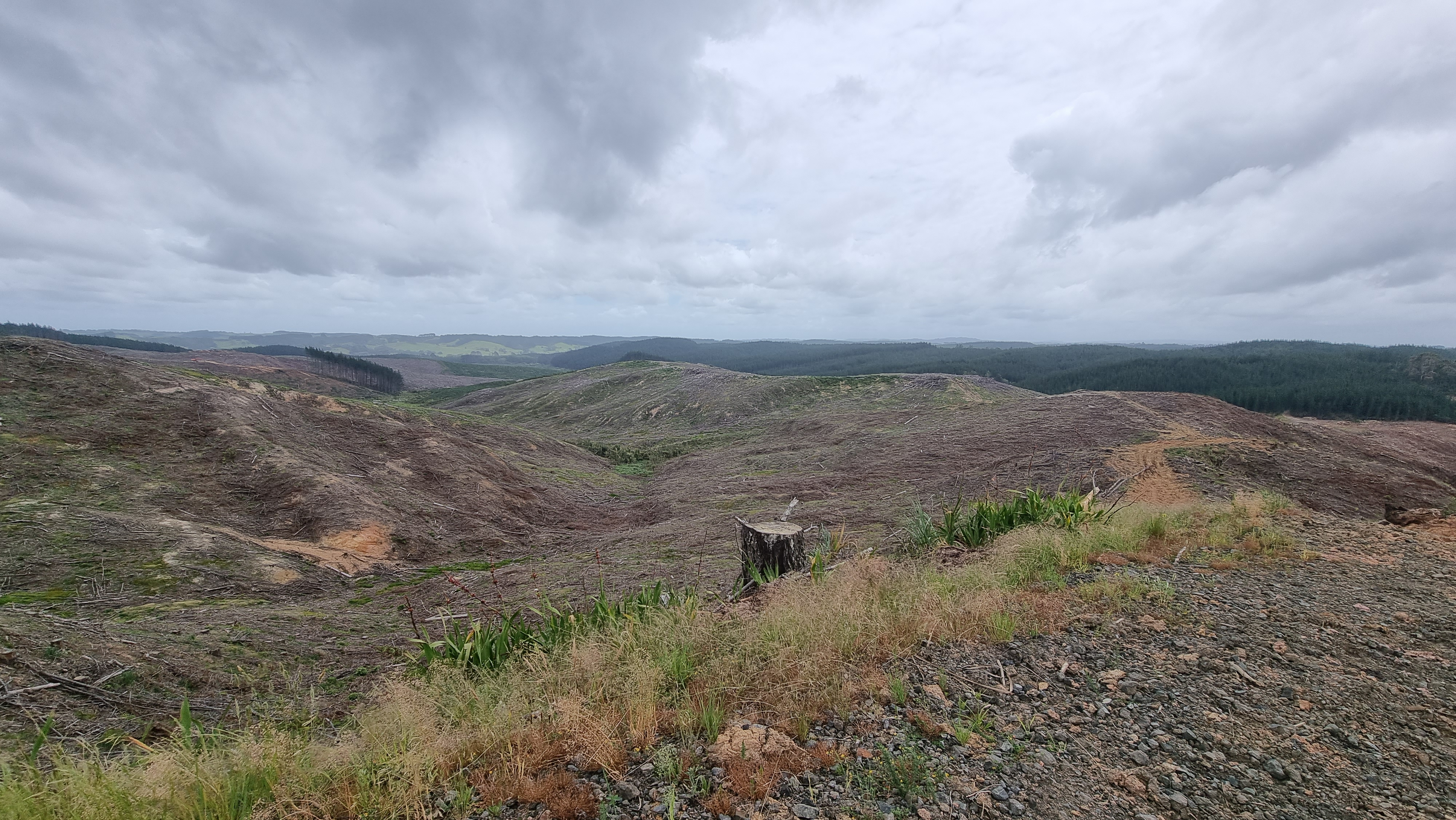
Recently felled section of the Riverhead Forest

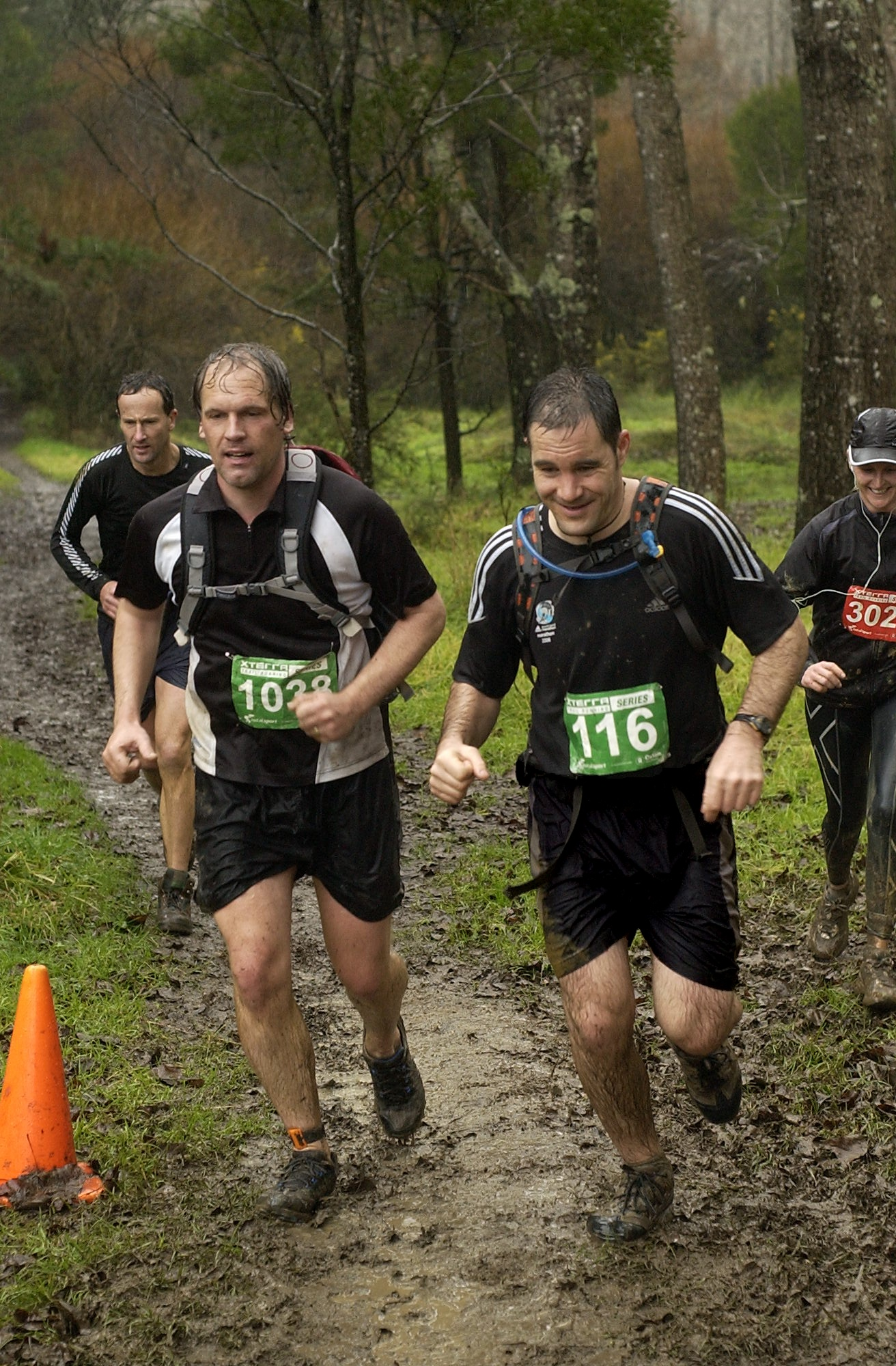
Trail runners competing in the XTerra Trail Run Series in 2009

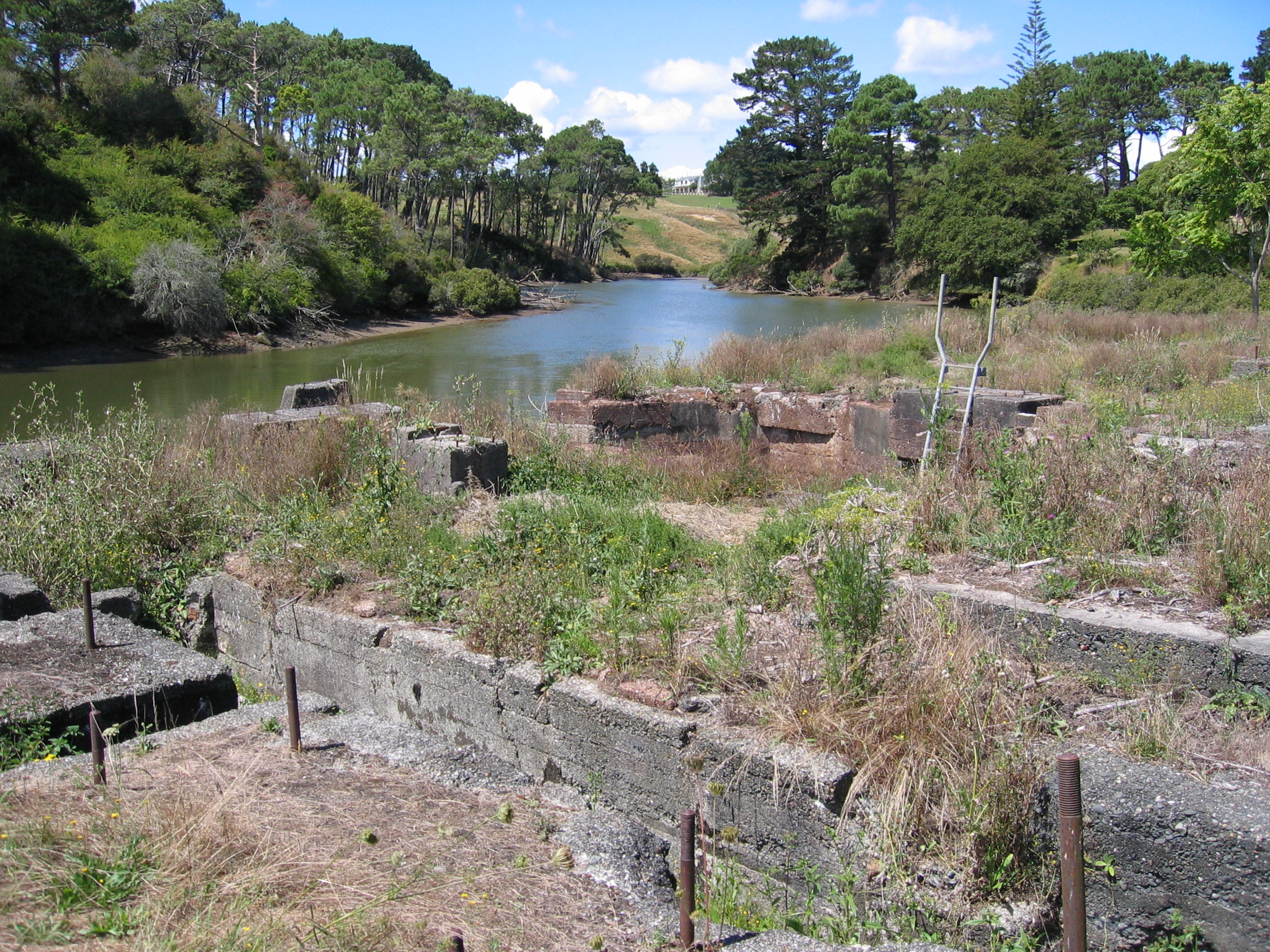
Remains of the Riverhead Forest mill
