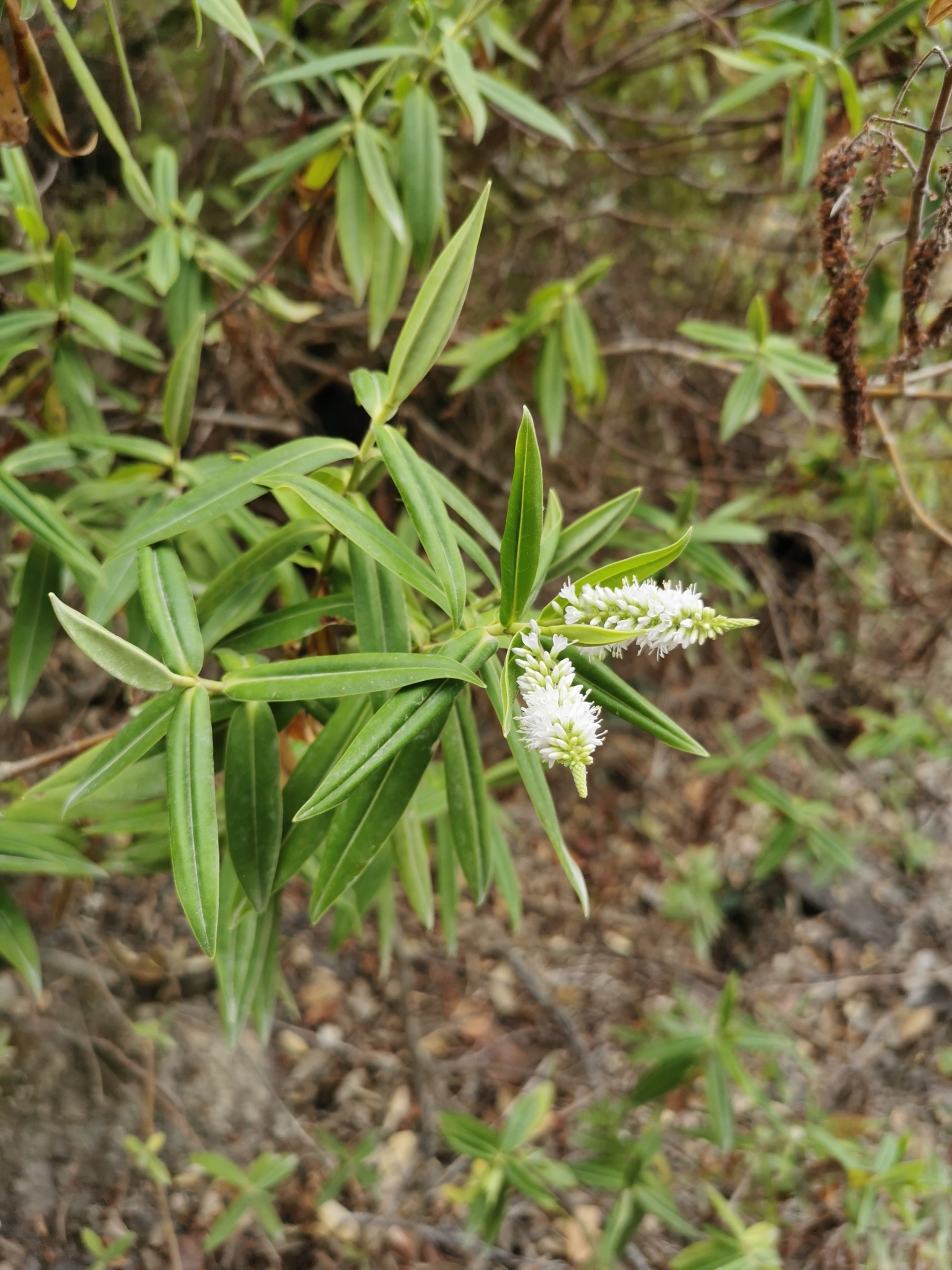
- Veronica pubescens subsp. pubescens

Scientific classification
- Kingdom: Plantae
- Clade: Tracheophytes
- Clade: Angiosperms
- Clade: Eudicots
- Clade: Asterids
- Order: Lamiales
- Family: Plantaginaceae
- Genus: Veronica
- Species: V. pubescens

Binomial name
- Veronica pubescens Banks & Sol. ex Benth.
- Known native range

Synonyms
- Hebe pubescens (Benth.) Cockayne et Allan

= Veronica pubescens =

Species of plant

Veronica pubescens is a species of flowering plant in the family Plantaginaceae. The plant has three known subspecies: Veronica pubescens subsp. pubescens (the Coromandel koromiko) Veronica pubescens subsp. rehuarum (Great Barrier koromiko) and Veronica pubescens subsp. sejuncta (the Mokohinau koromiko). The species is endemic to New Zealand, with subspecies found on the Coromandel Peninsula, Great Barrier Island and the Mokohinau Islands respectively.

== Taxonomy ==
The species was described by George Bentham in 1846, based on observations made by Joseph Banks and Daniel Solander during the First voyage of James Cook in 1769. The holotype was collected from "Opurangi" (Mercury Bay), and is held in the collections of the British Museum (BM 603447). In 1926, Leonard Cockayne and Harry Allan recombined the species as a member of the genus Hebe, meaning that the plant became referred to as Hebe pubescens. A 2004 paper by Michael James Bayly and Alison Kellow on the revision of the genus Hebe led to the original name, Veronica pubescens, being reinstated.

In 2003, morphological differences between three populations of the species led to the creation of three subspecies: Veronica pubescens subsp. pubescens found on the Coromandel Peninsula, Veronica pubescens subsp. rehuarum on Great Barrier Island, and Veronica pubescens subsp. sejuncta, found on the Mokohinau Islands and Little Barrier Island.

== Description ==
Veronica pubescens is a bushy shrub that grows up to 2 m (6 ft 7 in) in height. Veronica pubescens subsp. pubescens has longer leaf hairs than the other two subspecies, while Veronica pubescens subsp. rehuarum has shorter leaf hairs and leaves that are broadest below the midpoint. Veronica pubescens subsp. sejuncta can be identified due to having leaver broader above the midpoint.

== Distribution and habitat ==
The species is endemic to New Zealand. Veronica pubescens subsp. pubescens is found on the Coromandel Peninsula, Veronica pubescens subsp. rehuarum on Great Barrier Island, and Veronica pubescens subsp. sejuncta, found on the Mokohinau Islands and Little Barrier Island. The plants typically live in open coastal areas or scrublands, on rock outcrops and cliffs, and inland in areas of regenerating forest.

== Gallery ==
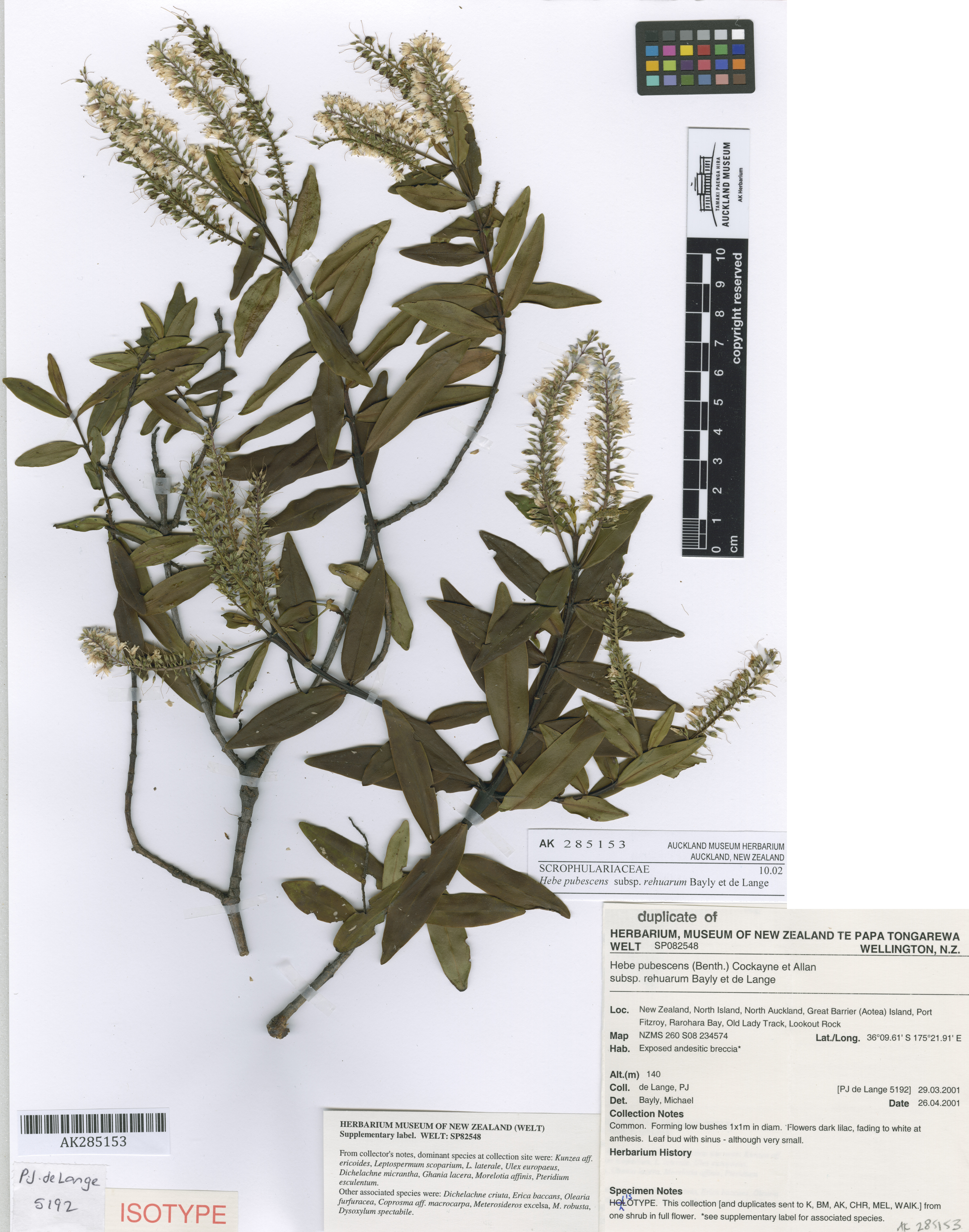
Veronica pubescens subsp. rehuarum type specimen from the herbarium of Auckland War Memorial Museum

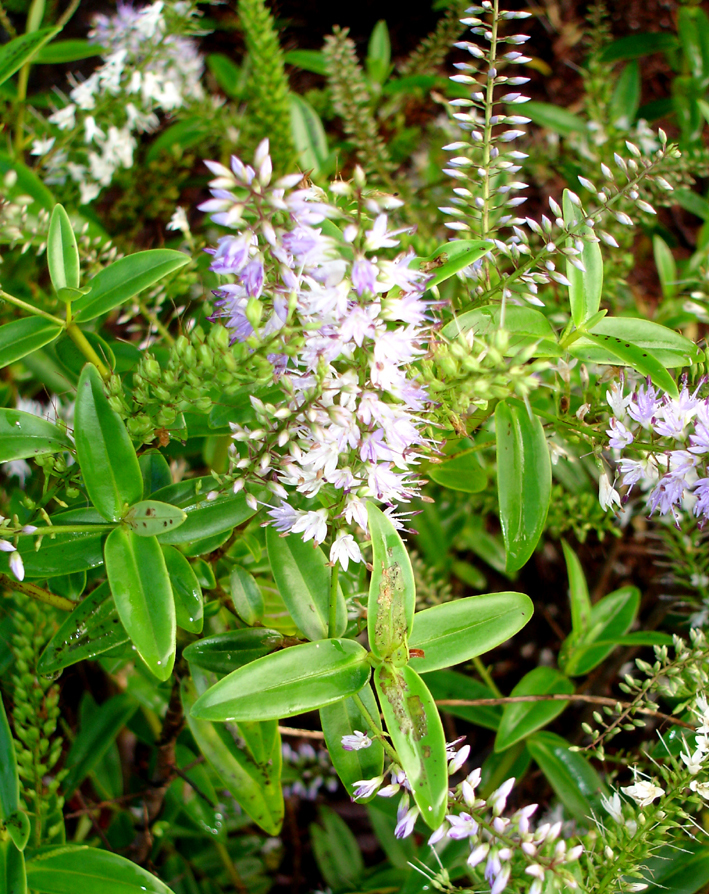
Veronica pubescens subsp. rehuarum

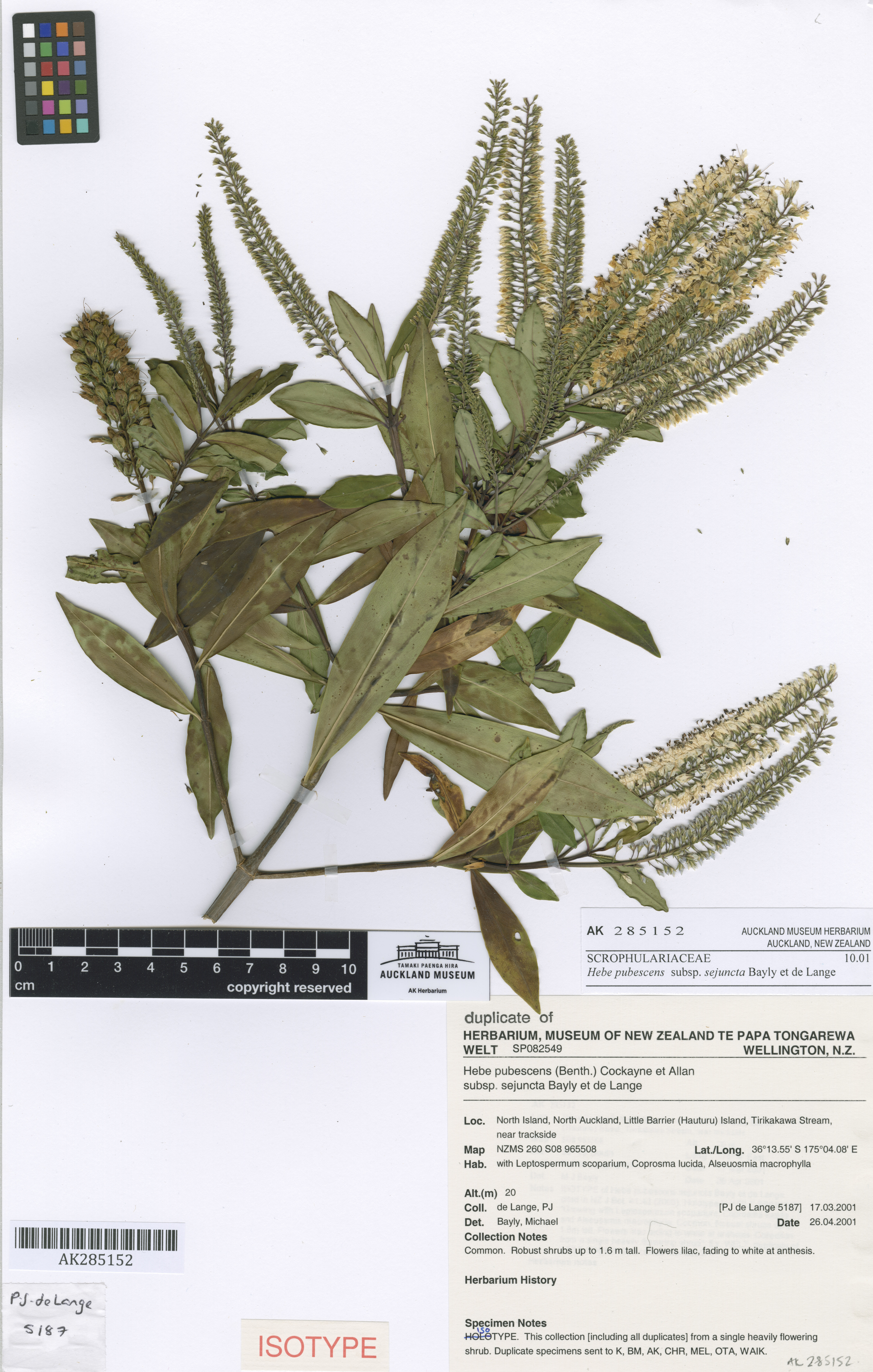
Veronica pubescens subsp. sejuncta type specimen from the herbarium of Auckland War Memorial Museum
