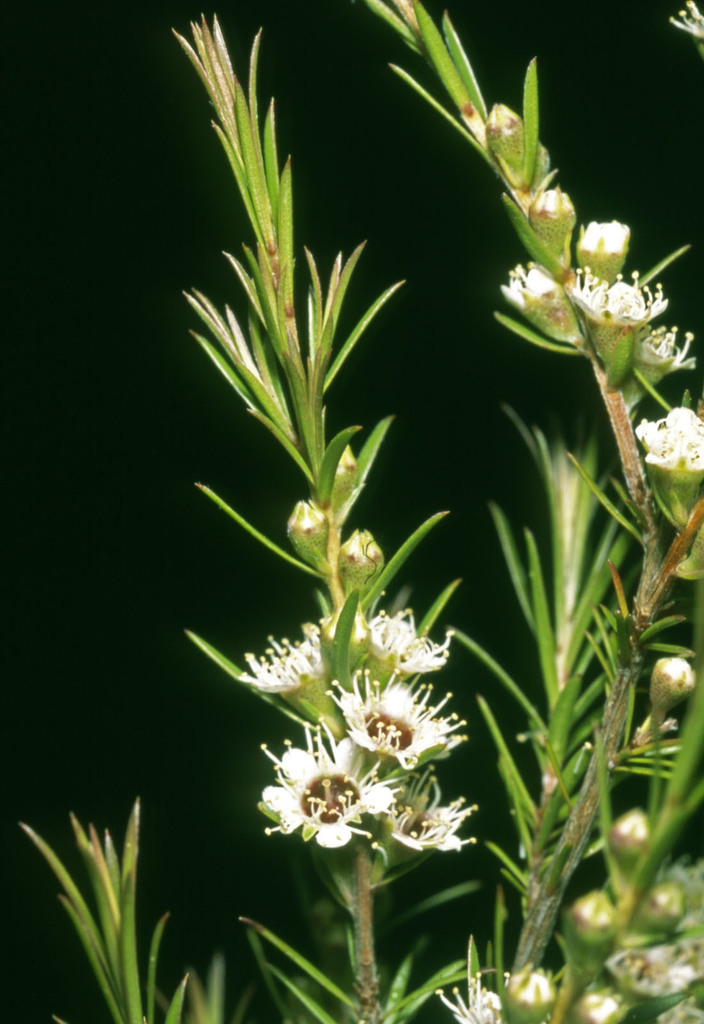
- Foliage and flowers

Conservation status
- Near Threatened (IUCN 3.1)

Scientific classification
- Kingdom: Plantae
- Clade: Tracheophytes
- Clade: Angiosperms
- Clade: Eudicots
- Clade: Rosids
- Order: Myrtales
- Family: Myrtaceae
- Genus: Kunzea
- Species: K. linearis

Binomial name
- Kunzea linearis (Kirk) de Lange & Toelken

Synonyms
- Kunzea ericoides var. linearis (Kirk) W.Harris; Leptospermum ericoides var. lineare Kirk; Leptospermum lineare (Kirk) Cockayne

= Kunzea linearis =

Rawiri manuka

Species of flowering plant

Kunzea linearis, also known by the Māori name rawiri manuka, is a flowering plant in the myrtle family, Myrtaceae and is endemic to New Zealand. It is a densely-foliaged shrub or small tree, characterised by very narrow leaves and clusters of small white flowers with five petals and a large number of stamens, which are longer than the petals. It grows in the north of the North Island and is the most distinctive of the New Zealand kunzeas.

== Description ==
Kunzea linearis is a densely-branched shrub or tree which usually grows to a height of up to 12 m (40 ft). It is densely branched, usually forming a rounded canopy up to 2 m (7 ft) in diameter. The leaves are densely crowded along the branches, especially near the ends and are hairy, about 9–20 mm (0.4–0.8 in) long, 0.5–1 mm (0.02–0.04 in) wide and lack a petiole. The flowers are arranged in more or less cylindrical groups of between three and forty, and the individual flowers are 2–6 mm (0.08–0.2 in) in diameter. The floral cup is 2–4 mm (0.08–0.2 in) long, 2.5–4 mm (0.1–0.2 in) in diameter, cup-shaped or barrel-shaped and usually has a covering of silvery white hairs. There are five sepal lobes 1–2 mm (0.04–0.08 in) long on the rim of the floral cup. The five or six petals are white, cream-coloured or pale pink, egg-shaped to almost round, about 2–4 mm (0.08–0.2 in) long and wide and there are between 40 and 50 cream coloured stamens which are longer than the petals. Flowering occurs between October and February and is followed by fruit which are woody, barrel-shaped capsules 1.5–3 mm (0.06–0.1 in) long, 2.5–4 mm (0.1–0.2 in) wide with persistent sepal tips.

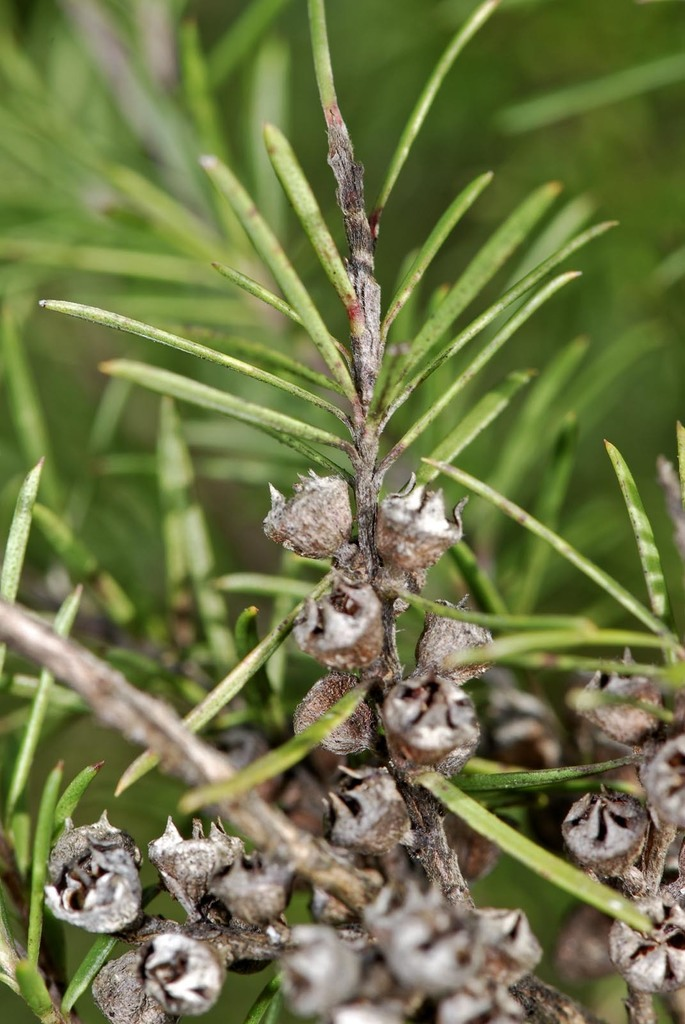
Fruit

== Taxonomy and naming ==
Rawiri manuka was first formally described in 1889 by Thomas Kirk who gave it the name Leptospermum ericoides var. lineare and published the description in his book "The Forest Flora of New Zealand". In 2014, Peter James de Lange and Hellmut Toelken changed the species' name to Kunzea linearis. The specific epithet (linearis) is a Latin word meaning "linear", referring to the linear leaves of this species.

== Distribution and habitat ==
Kunzea linearis mostly grows in coastal to lowland shrubland in impoverished soils and peat bogs. It mostly occurs in the northern part of the North Island from North Cape south to Ahipara and the Karikari Peninsula and sporadically south of there. It is the most distinctive of the New Zealand kunzeas.

== Conservation ==
This Kunzea species is listed as "At Risk - Declining". The main threats to the species are loss of habitat, collecting for firewood and hybridisation with other Kunzea species in urban settings.

== Use in horticulture ==
Rawiri manuka is most easily propagated from fresh seed.
