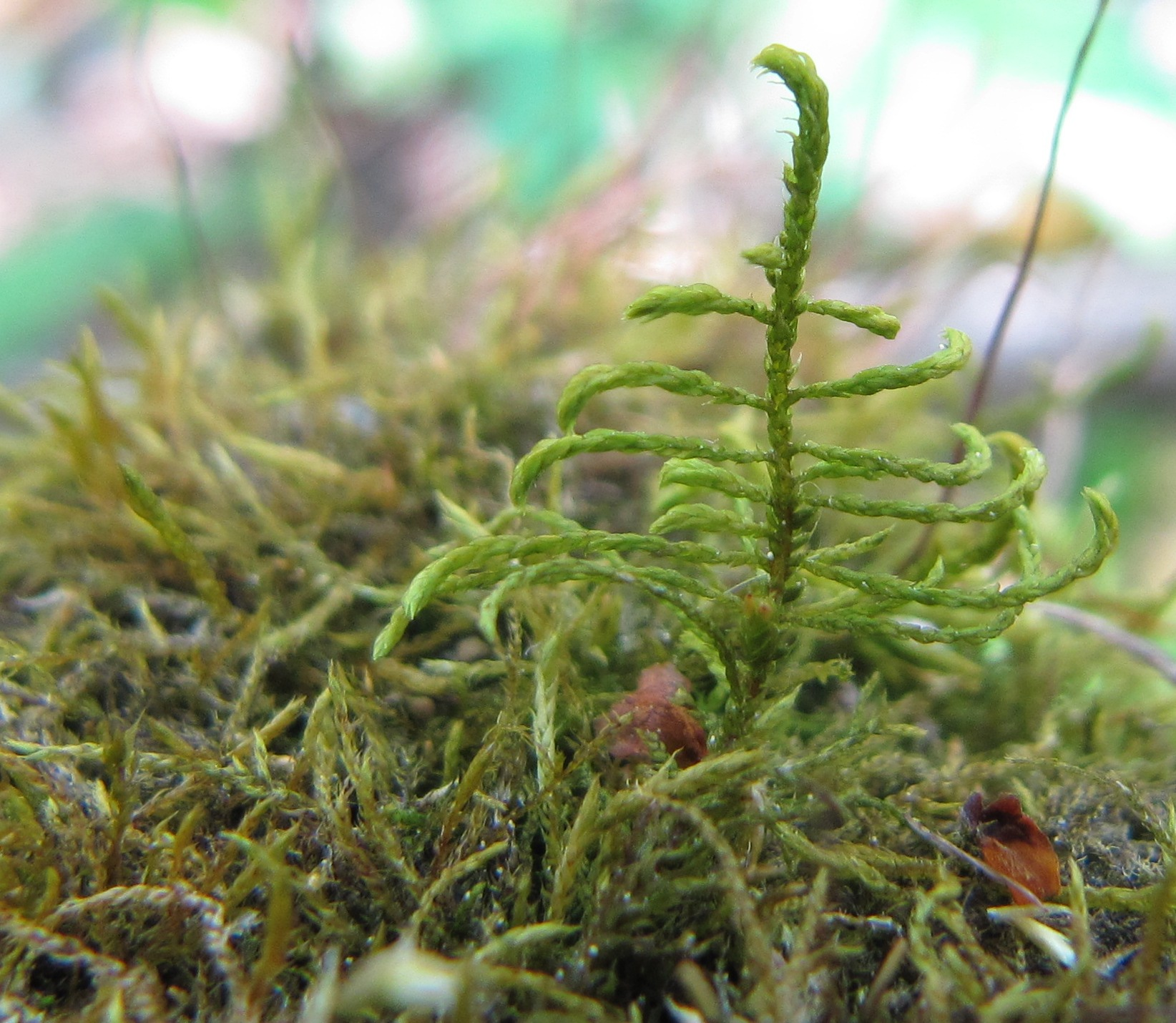
- Leskea polycarpa

Scientific classification
- Kingdom: Plantae
- Division: Bryophyta
- Class: Bryopsida
- Subclass: Bryidae
- Order: Hypnales
- Family: Leskeaceae; Schimp.

= Leskeaceae =

Family of mosses

Leskeaceae is a family of mosses belonging to the order Hypnales.

== Genera ==
As recognised by World Flora Online (2024);

- Fabronidium Müll. Hal. (1 species)
- Haplocladium (Müll. Hal.) Müll. Hal. (18 species)
- Hylocomiopsis Cardot (2 species)
- Ignatovia U.B. Deshmukh (1 species)
- Iwatsukiella W.R. Buck & H.A. Crum (1 species)
- Leptocladium Broth. (1 species)
- Leskea Hedw. (26 species)
- Leskeadelphus Herzog (1 species)
- Leskeella (Limpr.) Loeske (2 species)
- Lindbergia Kindb. (18 species)
- Orthoamblystegium Dixon & Sakurai (1 species)
- Platylomella A.L. Andrews (1 species)
- Pseudoleskeopsis Broth. (12 species)
- Rozea Besch. (6 species)
- Schwetschkea Müll. Hal. (14 species)

=== Formerly included ===
- Bryonorrisia L.R.Stark & W.R.Buck – now in Anomodontaceae
- Chileobryon Enroth – now in Neckeraceae
- Duthiella Müller Hal. ex V.F.Brotherus – now in Meteoriaceae
- Habrodon Schimp. – now in Habrodontaceae
- Lescuraea Schimp. – now in Pseudoleskeaceae
- Lesquereuxia Lindb. – synonym of Lescuraea
- Mamillariella Laz. – synonym of Lindbergia
- Pseudodimerodontium (Broth.) Broth. – synonym of Leskeadelphus
- Pseudoleskea Bruch & Schimp. – now in Pseudoleskeaceae
- Pseudoleskeella Kindb. – now in Pseudoleskeellaceae
- Rigodiadelphus Dixon – now in Pseudoleskeaceae
- Neolescuraea Noguchi – synonym of Rigodiadelphus
