= Scenic reserves of New Zealand =

Type of protected area in New Zealand

Scenic reserves are a type of New Zealand protected area. They are the most common, and probably most widespread, form of protected area in the country. Reserves vary size with most being less than 100 hectares, although some are more than 1,000 hectares. Some are "islands of unspoilt nature in a sea of farmland".

Scenic reserves were first created when communities decided to keep some original vegetation in an area where most original vegetation had been removed. Most are patches of bush, often close to roads. Statutory control of scenic reserves was covered by the Scenery Preservation Act 1903 until the passing of the Reserves Act 1977.

To classify an area as a scenic reserve a local authority is required to follow the procedure provided in that Reserves Act. The local authority needs to classify the area as a scenic reserve under section 16 of the Reserves Act 1977, and then declare the area a scenic reserve, giving the public an opportunity to raise objections. Once the allotted time for raising objections has past, the local authority is required to all objections submitted and decide whether to pass a resolution declaring the area a scenic reserve. If the resolution is passed, the resolution and all objects are forwarded to the Minister of Conservation. The resolution also needs to be gazetted by publishing the resolution in the New Zealand Gazette.

== North Island ==
The following scenic reserves are located in and around the North Island:

=== Northland ===
- Aponga Settlement Scenic Reserve
- Aputerewa Scenic Reserve
- Arapaoa River Scenic Reserve
- Awanui River Scenic Reserve
- Black Rocks Scenic Reserve
- Blake Bush Scenic Reserve
- Brattys Bush Scenic Reserve
- Bream Head Scenic Reserve
- Bream Islands Scenic Reserve
- Bream Tail Scenic Reserve
- Broadwood Scenic Reserve
- Brynderwyn Scenic Reserve
- Busby Head Scenic Reserve
- Collins Scenic Reserve
- Cooks Stream Scenic Reserve
- Deep Water Cove Scenic Reserve
- Dip Road Scenic Reserve
- Donnelly's Crossing Scenic Reserve
- Frampton Scenic Reserve
- Gill Road Scenic Reserve
- Gorrie Scenic Reserve
- Harrison Scenic Reserve
- Hilel Korman Scenic Reserve
- Horotutu Scenic Reserve
- Hugh Crawford Memorial Scenic Reserve
- Hukatere Scenic Reserve
- Hukatere School Site Scenic Reserve
- Kaeo Bush Scenic Reserve
- Kaiaka Quarry Scenic Reserve
- Kaihu Scenic Reserve
- Kaikohe Scenic Reserve
- Kaimarama Bay Scenic Reserve
- Kaimaro Scenic Reserve
- Kaitaia Scenic Reserve
- Kapiro Scenic Reserve
- Karakamatamata Scenic Reserve
- Katui Scenic Reserve
- Kauri Bushmans Memorial Scenic Reserve
- Kerikeri Inlet Scenic Reserve
- Kerikeri River Scenic Reserve
- Kings Kauri Scenic Reserve
- Kioreroa Scenic Reserve
- Kororareka Point Scenic Reserve
- Kukuparere Scenic Reserve
- Lake Waiporohita Scenic Reserve
- Langs Beach Scenic Reserve
- Lower Pahi River Scenic Reserve
- L T Hirst Scenic Reserve
- Mahinepua Peninsula Scenic Reserve
- Mamaranui Farm Settlement Scenic Reserve
- Manaia Ridge Scenic Reserve
- Manawahuna Scenic Reserve
- Mangakahia River Scenic Reserve
- Mangamuka Gorge Scenic Reserve
- Mangataipa Scenic Reserve
- Mangatete Farm Settlement Scenic Reserve
- Manginangina Scenic Reserve
- Mansbridge Scenic Reserve
- Marko Buselich Scenic Reserve
- Marlborough Road Scenic Reserve
- Marua Valley Scenic Reserve
- Mata Farm Settlement Scenic Reserve
- Matakohe River Scenic Reserve
- Mataraua Valley Scenic Reserve
- Matarau Island Scenic Reserve
- Maunganui Bluff Scenic Reserve
- Maungatapere Hill Scenic Reserve
- Maungatika Scenic Reserve
- Maungaturoto Scenic Reserve
- McKenzies of Limestone Hill Park Scenic Reserve
- Mimiha Scenic Reserve
- Mimiwhangata Scenic Reserve
- Mokaikai Scenic Reserve
- Montgomery's Memorial Bush Scenic Reserve
- Motatau Scenic Reserve
- Motuarahi Scenic Reserve
- Motukaraka Scenic Reserve
- Motu Kauri Island Scenic Reserve
- Motukawanui Island Scenic Reserve
- Motupapa Island Scenic Reserve
- Moturua Island Scenic Reserve
- Motutangi Scenic Reserve
- Motutapu Island Scenic Reserve
- Ngaiotonga Scenic Reserve
- Nga Kiekie Whawhanui a Uenuku Scenic Reserve
- Ngawha Scenic Reserve
- Ngunguru River Scenic Reserve
- Nihonui Scenic Reserve
- North River Scenic Reserve
- Okaharau Road Scenic Reserve
- Okahu Island Scenic Reserve
- Oke Bay Scenic Reserve
- Onoke Scenic Reserve
- Opouteke Scenic Reserve
- Opua Scenic Reserve
- Oraora Scenic Reserve
- Otaika Valley Scenic Reserve
- Otaneroa Scenic Reserve
- Otito Scenic Reserve
- Owhuia Scenic Reserve
- Paeroa-Knuckle Point Scenic Reserve
- Pakanae Reserve
- Pakaraka Kauri Scenic Reserve
- Pakotai Scenic Reserve
- Papakuri Scenic Reserve
- Paparoa Creek Scenic Reserve
- Paponga Scenic Reserve
- Parahaki Scenic Reserve
- Parahi Scenic Reserve
- Paranui Scenic Reserve
- Pareokawa Water Conservation Scenic Reserve
- Pitokuku Scenic Reserve
- Pohuenui Scenic Reserve
- Popo Scenic Reserve
- Poroporo Island Scenic Reserve
- Poupouwhenua Scenic Reserve
- Pukeareinga Scenic Reserve
- Pukekaroro Scenic Reserve
- Pukemiro Block Scenic Reserve
- Puketi Scenic Reserve
- Puketona Scenic Reserve
- Purua Scenic Reserve
- Rabbit & Goat Island Scenic Reserve
- Rainbow Falls Scenic Reserve
- Ranfurly Bay Scenic Reserve
- Rangitane Scenic Reserve
- Rawene Scenic Reserve
- Reotahi Scenic Reserve
- Riponui Scenic Reserve
- Robert Hastie Memorial Scenic Reserve
- Rotokakahi River Scenic Reserve
- Ruakākā Scenic Reserve
- Runaruna Scenic Reserve
- Smokey Hill Scenic Reserve
- Soda Springs Scenic Reserve
- Stockyard Point Scenic Reserve
- St. Pauls Rock Scenic Reserve
- Sweetwater Scenic Reserve
- Taha Moana Scenic Reserve
- Taheke Scenic Reserve
- Takou River Scenic Reserve
- Tamateatai Point Scenic Reserve
- Tangowahine Scenic Reserve
- Tapuhi Scenic Reserve
- Tapuwae Scenic Reserve
- Taraire Scenic Reserve
- Taranaki Island Scenic Reserve
- Tauranga Valley Scenic Reserve
- Te Koroa Scenic Reserve
- Te Kowhai Creek Scenic Reserve
- Te Kuihi Scenic Reserve
- Te Opu Scenic Reserve
- Te Toroa Scenic Reserve
- Te-Uri-O-Hau Scenic Reserve
- Te Wai-O-Te Marama Scenic Reserve
- Timperleys Bush Scenic Reserve
- Tipatipa Scenic Reserve
- Tokatoka Scenic Reserve
- Topuni Scenic Reserve
- Toretore Island Scenic Reserve
- Trounson Kauri Park Scenic Reserve
- Tutamoe Scenic Reserve
- Upper Pahi River Scenic Reserve
- Upper Paparoa Creek Scenic Reserve
- Uretiti Scenic Reserve
- Utakura Scenic Reserve
- Wahaotetupua Scenic Reserve
- Waimamaku Scenic Reserve
- Waimata Settlement Scenic Reserve
- Waiotama Scenic Reserve
- Waipapa Stream Scenic Reserve
- Waipu Caves Road Scenic Reserve
- Waipu Gorge Scenic Reserve
- Waipu Scenic Reserve
- Wairua Falls Scenic Reserve
- Waitangi Wetland Scenic Reserve
- Waitawa Scenic Reserve
- Waro Limestone Scenic Reserve
- Watkin Powel Scenic Reserve
- Wekaweka Scenic Reserve
- Whakaangi Scenic Reserve
- Whakapirau River Scenic Reserve
- Whangamumu Scenic Reserve
- Whangaruru Harbour Scenic Reserve
- Whangaruru North Head Scenic Reserve

=== Auckland ===
- Burgess Island Scenic Reserve
- Harataonga Scenic Reserve
- Kohatutara Scenic Reserve
- Kotuku Point Scenic Reserve
- Leigh Scenic Reserve
- Mātaitai Scenic Reserve
- Moturekareka Island Scenic Reserve
- Motutara Island Scenic Reserve
- Ngā Pona-toru-a-Peretū Scenic Reserve
- Okura Bush Scenic Reserve
- Papa Turoa Scenic Reserve
- Pukekohe Hill Scenic Reserve
- Rabbit & Goat Island Scenic Reserve
- Rakitu Island Scenic Reserve
- Rangatawhiri Scenic Reserve
- Rangitoto Island Scenic Reserve
- Raventhorpe Scenic Reserve
- Richardson Scenic Reserve
- Sharp Point Scenic Reserve
- Smeltinghouse Bay Scenic Reserve
- Tai Rawhiti Scenic Reserve
- Te Atamira Scenic Reserve
- Te Matuku Bay Scenic Reserve
- Te Morehu Scenic Reserve
- Ti Point Scenic Reserve
- Tryphena Scenic Reserve
- Waiheke Island Scenic Reserve
- Wairoa Gorge Scenic Reserve
- Whakatiri Scenic Reserve

=== Bay of Plenty Region ===
- Arahiwi Railway Scenic Reserve
- Carrie Gibbons Scenic Reserve
- Dansey's Road Scenic Reserve
- Hawai Scenic Reserve
- Hidden Gorge Scenic Reserve
- Hinehopu Scenic Reserve
- Isthmus Scenic Reserve
- Kōhī Point Scenic Reserve
- Lake Ōkareka Scenic Reserve
- Lake Rotoiti Scenic Reserve
- Lake Rotokakahi (Green Lake) Scenic Reserve
- Lake Rotomā Scenic Reserve
- Lake Tarawera Scenic Reserve
- Lake Tikitapu Scenic Reserve
- Makatiti Dome Scenic Reserve
- Mamaku Scenic Reserve
- Mangaone Scenic Reserve
- Mangapouri Scenic Reserve
- Mangorewa Scenic Reserve
- Matatā Scenic Reserve
- Matawhaura North Scenic Reserve
- Maunga Kākaramea Scenic Reserve
- Meremere Hill Scenic Reserve
- Miller Bush Scenic Reserve
- Minden Scenic Reserve
- Mokorua Bush Scenic Reserve
- Motuotau Island Scenic Reserve
- Mount Ngongotahā Scenic Reserve
- Ohinekoao Scenic Reserve
- Ohineteraraku Scenic Reserve
- Ōhiwa Scenic Reserve
- Ōhope Scenic Reserve
- Ōkere Falls Scenic Reserve
- Omanawa Scenic Reserve
- Ongaonga Scenic Reserve
- Opape Scenic Reserve
- Oroi Scenic Reserve
- Orokawa Scenic Reserve
- Oscar Reeve Scenic Reserve
- Otawa Scenic Reserve
- Pareheru Scenic Reserve
- Parimahana Scenic Reserve
- Pokopoko Stream Scenic Reserve
- Puketoki Scenic Reserve
- Roydon Downs Scenic Reserve
- Stanley Falls Scenic Reserve
- Tarawera Landing Scenic Reserve
- Tarukenga Scenic Reserve
- Parimahana Scenic Reserve
- Pokopoko Stream Scenic Reserve
- Puketoki Scenic Reserve
- Roydon Downs Scenic Reserve
- Stanley Falls Scenic Reserve
- Tarawera Landing Scenic Reserve
- Tarukenga Scenic Reserve
- Taumata Scenic Reserve
- Tautau Scenic Reserve
- Tauwhare Pa Scenic Reserve
- Te Atuahauta Scenic Reserve
- Te Rerekawau Scenic Reserve
- Te Waerenga Scenic Reserve
- Toa Toa Scenic Reserve
- Tokata Scenic Reserve
- Umurua Scenic Reserve
- Uretara Island Scenic Reserve
- Waimana Gorge Scenic Reserve
- Waimangu Scenic Reserve
- Waione Block Scenic Reserve
- Waiotahe Estuary Scenic Reserve
- Waiotahe Spit Scenic Reserve
- Waiotane Scenic Reserve
- Waioweka Gorge Scenic Reserve
- Whanarua Bay Scenic Reserve

=== Gisborne Region ===
- Gray's Bush Scenic Reserve
- Hangaroa Scenic Reserve
- Henri Loisel Scenic Reserve
- Mākaramea Scenic Reserve
- Makaretū Scenic Reserve
- Mangarere Scenic Reserve
- Mōtū Scenic Reserve
- Norma Leonie Shelton Scenic Reserve
- Nuhiti Q Scenic Reserve
- Otoko Scenic Reserve
- Pākōwhai Scenic Reserve
- Papatu Scenic Reserve
- Pukeamaru Scenic Reserve
- Rākauroa Scenic Reserve
- Strathblane Scenic Reserve
- Tahungatawa Scenic Reserve
- Pākōwhai Scenic Reserve
- Rākauroa Scenic Reserve
- Strathblane Scenic Reserve
- Tahungatawa Scenic Reserve
- Te Ārai Scenic Reserve
- Waioweka Gorge Scenic Reserve
- Waipare Scenic Reserve
- Whakarau Scenic Reserve
- Whakaroa Scenic Reserve
- Wharerata Hill Scenic Reserve

=== Hawke's Bay ===
- A'Deanes Bush Scenic Reserve
- Ball's Clearing Scenic Reserve
- Begleys Fill Scenic Reserve
- Bellbird Bush Scenic Reserve
- Elsthorpe Scenic Reserve
- Erepeti Scenic Reserve
- Frasers Bush Scenic Reserve
- Hiranui Scenic Reserve
- Hutchinson Scenic Reserve
- Inglis Bush Scenic Reserve
- Kakariki Scenic Reserve
- Mangapukahu Scenic Reserve
- Mangatewai River Scenic Reserve
- Maraetotara Gorge Scenic Reserve
- Maraetotara Scenic Reserve
- Matai Moana Scenic Reserve
- Mcleans Bush Scenic Reserve
- Mohi Bush Scenic Reserve
- Monckton Scenic Reserve
- Opoto Scenic Reserve
- Opouahi Scenic Reserve
- Parkers Bush Scenic Reserve
- Paterson's Bush Scenic Reserve
- Ruakituri Scenic Reserve
- Sentry Box Scenic Reserve
- Springhill Scenic Reserve
- Tangoio Falls Scenic Reserve
- Tarawera Hot Springs Reserve
- Te Raupo Scenic Reserve
- Te Reinga Scenic Reserve
- Tukituki River Scenic Reserve
- Turangakumu Scenic Reserve
- Waiatai Scenic Reserve
- Waipātiki Scenic Reserve
- Waipunga Falls Scenic Reserve
- Waitara / Glenfalls Scenic Reserve
- White Pine Bush Scenic Reserve
- William Hartree Memorial Scenic Reserve

=== Manawatū-Whanganui Region ===
- Almadale Scenic Reserve
- Aorangi Scenic Reserve
- Āpiti Scenic Reserve
- Arawata Caves Scenic Reserve
- Auputa Scenic Reserve
- Awahou Scenic Reserve
- Awahuri Scenic Reserve
- Bottom Bush Scenic Reserve
- Bridge Road Scenic Reserve
- Bruce Memorial Scenic Reserve
- Bruce Park Scenic Reserve
- Carnival Park Scenic Reserve
- C.L. Pemberton Memorial Park Scenic Reserve
- Dress Circle Scenic Reserve
- Galbraith Scenic Reserve
- Glenmorven Scenic Reserve
- Gordon Park Scenic Reserve
- Greystoke Scenic Reserve
- Haehaekupenga Scenic Reserve
- Hales Road Scenic Reserve
- Hapu Scenic Reserve
- Haukōpuapua Scenic Reserve
- Hautapu Scenic Reserve
- Hawkins Wetland Scenic Reserve
- Hazelburn Scenic Reserve
- Hikumutu Scenic Reserve
- Horopito Scenic Reserve
- Kahu Scenic Reserve
- Kahuterawa Bush Scenic Reserve
- Kaikawaka Scenic Reserve
- Kaitapa Scenic Reserve
- Kaituna Scenic Reserve
- Kakahi Scenic Reserve
- Kanihinihi Scenic Reserve
- Kapuha Scenic Reserve
- Karetu Scenic Reserve
- Karewarewa Scenic Reserve
- Kauarapaoa Scenic Reserve
- Kauhangaroa Scenic Reserve
- Kawautahi Scenic Reserve
- Kawhātau Scenic Reserve
- Koatanui Scenic Reserve
- Kohitere Scenic Reserve
- Kohura Scenic Reserve
- Kokakonui Scenic Reserve
- Konini Scenic Reserve
- Kopuha Road Scenic Reserve
- Kouturoa Scenic Reserve
- Kururau Scenic Reserve
- Lairdvale Scenic Reserve
- Makatote Scenic Reserve
- Makiekie Scenic Reserve
- Makino Scenic Reserve
- Makohine Scenic Reserve
- Makopua Scenic Reserve
- Makuhou Scenic Reserve
- Makuri Conservation Scenic Reserve
- Makuri Gorge Scenic Reserve
- Makuri Township Scenic Reserve
- Manawanui Scenic Reserve
- Manawatū Gorge Scenic Reserve
- Manawatū Scenic Reserve
- Mangaehuehu Scenic Reserve
- Mangaetoroa Scenic Reserve
- Manganuioteao Scenic Reserve
- Mangaorakei North Scenic Reserve
- Mangaoturu Scenic Reserve
- Mangapapa Stream Scenic Reserve
- Mangapuaka Stream Scenic Reserve
- Mangapurua Valley Scenic Reserve
- Mangaroa Scenic Reserve
- Manga Te Puhi Scenic Reserve
- Mangatipona Scenic Reserve
- Mangatoro Scenic Reserve
- Mangaweka Scenic Reserve
- Mangoira Scenic Reserve
- Mataru Scenic Reserve
- Matiere Scenic Reserve
- Maungakaretu Scenic Reserve

=== Wellington Region ===
- Carter Scenic Reserve
- Castlepoint Scenic Reserve
- Colonial Knob Scenic Reserve
- Duck Creek Scenic Reserve
- E C Holmes Memorial Scenic Reserve
- Fitzherbert Scenic Reserve
- Hemi Matenga Memorial Park Scenic Reserve
- Johnston Hill Scenic Reserve
- Kahutara Scenic Reserve
- Kaitawa Scenic Reserve
- Lowes Bush Scenic Reserve
- Lowry Bay Scenic Reserve
- Maungakōtukutuku Scenic Reserve
- Oporua Scenic Reserve
- Oumakura Scenic Reserve
- Paraparaumu Scenic Reserve
- Percy Scenic Reserve
- Pukaha / Mount Bruce Scenic Reserve
- Pūtangirua Pinnacles Scenic Reserve
- R W Tate Memorial Scenic Reserve
- Tora Bush Scenic Reserve
- Trentham Scenic Reserve
- Tuhitarata Bush Scenic Reserve
- Waikanae Scenic Reserve
- Wainuiomata Scenic Reserve
- Whakatiki Scenic Reserve
- Wilf Mexted Scenic Reserve

== South Island ==
The following scenic reserves are located in and around the South Island:

=== Nelson ===
- Boulder Bank Scenic Reserve
- Cable Bay Scenic Reserve
- Whangamoa Scenic Reserve

=== Tasman ===
- Milnthorpe Park Scenic Reserve

=== West Coast ===
- Ahaura-Kopara Scenic Reserve
- Arnold River Scenic Reserve
- Arorangi Scenic Reserve
- Blackadder Scenic Reserve
- Coal Creek Scenic Reserve
- Costello Hill Scenic Reserve
- Dee Creek Scenic Reserve
- Denniston Road - Scenic Reserve
- Denniston Scenic Reserve
- Four Mile Scenic Reserve
- Hiwinui Scenic Reserve
- Inangahua Landing Scenic Reserve
- Kaiata Scenic Reserve
- Karamea Bluff Scenic Reserve
- Karamea River Scenic Reserve
- Langridge Scenic Reserve
- Lewis Pass Scenic Reserve
- Lower Buller Gorge Scenic Reserve
- Mai Mai Scenic Reserve
- Mawheraiti Scenic Reserve
- Mirfin Scenic Reserve
- Mount Courtney Scenic Reserve
- Ngakawau Scenic Reserve
- Okari Spit Scenic Reserve
- Omotumotu Scenic Reserve
- Orowaiti Estuary Scenic Reserve
- Orowaiti River Scenic Reserve
- Otututu Scenic Reserve
- Punakaiki Scenic Reserve
- Rahu Scenic Reserve
- Rapahoe Range Scenic Reserve
- Rosemount Scenic Reserve
- Rough and Brown Creek Scenic Reserve
- Station Creek Scenic Reserve
- Stockton Scenic Reserve
- Tini Kaiwai Scenic Reserve
- Upper Buller Gorge Scenic Reserve
- Woolley River Scenic Reserve

=== Canterbury ===
- Adderley Head Scenic Reserve
- Ahuriri Bush Scenic Reserve
- Akaroa Head Scenic Reserve
- Alford Scenic Reserve
- Armstrong Scenic Reserve
- Ben Avon Scenic Reserve
- Buckleys Bay Scenic Reserve
- Burke Pass Scenic Reserve
- Carews Peak Scenic Reserve
- Cass Peak Scenic Reserve
- Cave Stream Scenic Reserve
- Claremont Scenic Reserve
- Coopers Knob Scenic Reserve
- Devils Gap Scenic Reserve
- Ellangowan Scenic Reserve
- Fyffe Palmer Scenic Reserve
- Garden Of Tane Scenic Reserve
- Glenralloch Scenic Reserve
- Goodwin Scenic Reserve
- Goose Bay-Omihi Scenic Reserve
- Gore Bay Scenic Reserve
- Governors Bay Scenic Reserve
- Hae Hae Te Moana Scenic Reserve
- Half Moon Bay Scenic Reserve
- Hapuku Scenic Reserve
- Hay Scenic Reserve
- Herbert Peak Scenic Reserve
- Hoods Bush Scenic Reserve
- Hoon Hay Scenic Reserve
- Hunter Native Forest Scenic Reserve
- Isolated Hill Scenic Reserve
- Jollies Bush Scenic Reserve
- Jordan Stream Scenic Reserve
- Kaituna Spur Scenic Reserve
- Kaituna Valley Scenic Reserve
- Karetu Scenic Reserve
- Kean Point Scenic Reserve
- Kennedy's Bush Scenic Reserve
- King Billy Island Scenic Reserve
- Kura Tāwhiti Scenic Reserve
- Kurow Scenic Reserve
- Lake Alexandrina Scenic Reserve
- Lake Grasmere Scenic Reserve
- Lake Guyon Scenic Reserve
- Lake Tennyson Scenic Reserve
- Lewis Pass Scenic Reserve
- Limestone Creek Scenic Reserve
- Lindis Pass Scenic Reserve
- Little Akaroa Scenic Reserve
- Long Bay Scenic Reserve
- Lords Bush Scenic Reserve
- Lottery Bush Scenic Reserve
- Lyttelton Scenic Reserve
- McLeans Grassland Reserve
- Magnet Bay Scenic Reserve
- Mangamaunu Scenic Reserve
- Manuka Bay Scenic Reserve
- Matata Scenic Reserve
- Montgomery Park Scenic Reserve
- Morice Settlement Scenic Reserve
- Mount Manakau Scenic Reserve
- Mount Sinclair Scenic Reserve
- Mt Alford Scenic Reserve
- Mt Cavendish Scenic Reserve
- Mt Fitzgerald Scenic Reserve
- Mt Nimrod Scenic Reserve
- Mt Pearce Scenic Reserve
- Napenape Scenic Reserve
- Ngaroma Scenic Reserve
- Ohau Terminal Moraine Scenic Reserve
- Okiwi Bay Scenic Reserve - Kaikoura
- Okuti Valley Scenic Reserve
- Orari Gorge Scenic Reserve
- Otaio Gorge Scenic Reserve
- Otepatotu Scenic Reserve
- Palm Gully Scenic Reserve
- Paparoa Point Scenic Reserve
- Pareora Scenic Reserve
- Peel Forest Park Scenic Reserve
- Peraki Bay Scenic Reserve
- Peraki Saddle Scenic Reserve
- Pudding Hill Scenic Reserve
- Puhi Puhi Scenic Reserve
- Rakautara Scenic Reserve
- Raules Gully Scenic Reserve
- Shag Rock Scenic Reserve
- Sharplin Falls Scenic Reserve
- Sign Of The Packhorse Scenic Reserve
- Snowden Scenic Reserve
- Sugarloaf Scenic Reserve
- Talbot Forest Scenic Reserve
- Tapuae O Uenuku Scenic Reserve
- Tasman Smith Scenic Reserve
- Tauhinu-korokio Scenic Reserve
- Tenehaun Scenic Reserve
- Te Oka Scenic Reserve
- Terako Downs Scenic Reserve
- The Tors Scenic Reserve
- Thomson Park Scenic Reserve
- Tiromoana Scenic Reserve
- Tutakakahikura Scenic Reserve
- View Hill Scenic Reserve
- Waghorn Scenic Reserve
- Waiau Rivermouth Scenic Reserve
- Waihi Gorge Scenic Reserve
- Wainui Scenic Reserve
- Waipuna Saddle Scenic Reserve
- Wairangi Scenic Reserve
- Whatarangi Totara Scenic Reserve
- Witch Hill Scenic Reserve

=== Otago ===
- Arthurs Point Gorge Scenic Reserve
- Autaia Scenic Reserve
- Awakiki Bush Scenic Reserve
- Barn Creek Scenic Reserve
- Barrs Falls Scenic Reserve
- Ben Avon Scenic Reserve
- Bendigo Scenic Reserve
- Ben Lomond Scenic Reserve
- Ben Nevis Scenic Reserve
- Boundary Creek Scenic Reserve
- Bowlers Creek Scenic Reserve
- Burns Park Scenic Reserve
- Bushy Beach Scenic Reserve
- Catlins Lake Scenic Reserve
- Catlins Point - Elbow Scenic Reserve
- Catlins River Scenic Reserve
- Chalkies Scenic Reserve
- Chrystalls Beach Scenic Reserve
- Cotton Scenic Reserve
- Dart Island Scenic Reserve
- Deep Creek Scenic Reserve
- Douglas & Trevor Murray Memorial Scenic Reserve
- Evansdale Glen Scenic Reserve
- Fallburn Scenic Reserve
- Feehly Hill Scenic Reserve
- Flagstaff Scenic Reserve
- Glenburnie Scenic Reserve
- Glenomaru Valley Scenic Reserve
- Goat Island/Rakiriri Scenic Reserve
- Goodwood Scenic Reserve
- Grahams Bush Scenic Reserve
- Helena Falls Scenic Reserve
- Henley Scenic Reserve
- Heyward Point Scenic Reserve
- Hinahina Cove Scenic Reserve
- Hinahina Island Scenic Reserve
- Hope Hill Scenic Reserve
- Jacks Bay Scenic Reserve
- Kaikorai Scenic Reserve
- Kaka Point Scenic Reserve
- Kane Scenic Reserve
- Keen Scenic Reserve
- Kinakina Island Scenic Reserve
- Kurow Scenic Reserve
- Lake Dispute Scenic Reserve
- Leithen Bush Scenic Reserve
- Leith Valley Scenic Reserve
- Lindis Pass Scenic Reserve
- Locharburn Scenic Reserve
- Long Beach Scenic Reserve
- Long Point Scenic Reserve
- Luggate Creek Scenic Reserve
- Maclennan River Scenic Reserve
- Manuka Gorge Scenic Reserve
- Manuka Point Scenic Reserve
- Maukaatua Scenic Reserve
- McKay Creek Scenic Reserve
- Mill Creek Scenic Reserve
- Moeraki Boulders/Kaihinaki Scenic Reserve
- Mount Cargill Scenic Reserve
- Mount Pleasant Scenic Reserve
- Mou Tapu Scenic Reserve
- Mou Waho Island (Harwich) Scenic Reserve
- Mt Benger Scenic Reserve
- Mt Crichton Scenic Reserve
- Mt Iron Scenic Reserve
- Newcastle Scenic Reserve
- Old Man Range Scenic Reserve
- Orokonui Scenic Reserve
- Owaka Valley Scenic Reserve
- Papatowai Scenic Reserve
- Pātītī Scenic Reserve
- Piata Scenic Reserve
- Pigeon Bush Scenic Reserve
- Popotunoa Hill Scenic Reserve
- Pounawea Scenic Reserve
- Purakaunui Bay Scenic Reserve
- Purakaunui Falls Scenic Reserve
- Purakaunui Stream Scenic Reserve
- Redbank Scenic Reserve
- Reko Point Scenic Reserve
- Rock and Pillar Scenic Reserve
- Routeburn Scenic Reserve
- Samson Hill Scenic Reserve
- Serpentine Scenic Reserve
- Silver Island Scenic Reserve
- Silverpeaks Scenic Reserve
- Stevensons Island Scenic Reserve
- Stony Stream Scenic Reserve
- Sullivans Bush Scenic Reserve
- Surat Bay Scenic Reserve
- Sutton Salt Lake Scenic Reserve
- Table Hill Scenic Reserve
- Tahakopa Bay Scenic Reserve
- Tahakopa River Scenic Reserve
- Taieri Gorge/Outram Glen Scenic Reserve
- Taieri Island/Moturata Scenic Reserve
- Taieri Rapids Scenic Reserve
- Taieri River Scenic Reserve
- Tautuku Bay Scenic Reserve
- Te Wai-o-Koroiko Scenic Reserve
- The Nook Scenic Reserve
- Tirohanga Scenic Reserve
- Titeremoana (Pudding Island) Scenic Reserve
- Trotters Gorge Scenic Reserve
- Tuhawaiki Island Scenic Reserve
- Tunnel Rocks Scenic Reserve
- Waianakarua Scenic Reserve
- Waihemo Scenic Reserve
- Waipati Beach Scenic Reserve
- Waipori Falls Scenic Reserve
- Warepa Scenic Reserve
- White Island Scenic Reserve
- William King Scenic Reserve
- Wilsons Scenic Reserve
