= Ahuriri Scenic Reserve =

Conservation reserve in Canterbury, New Zealand

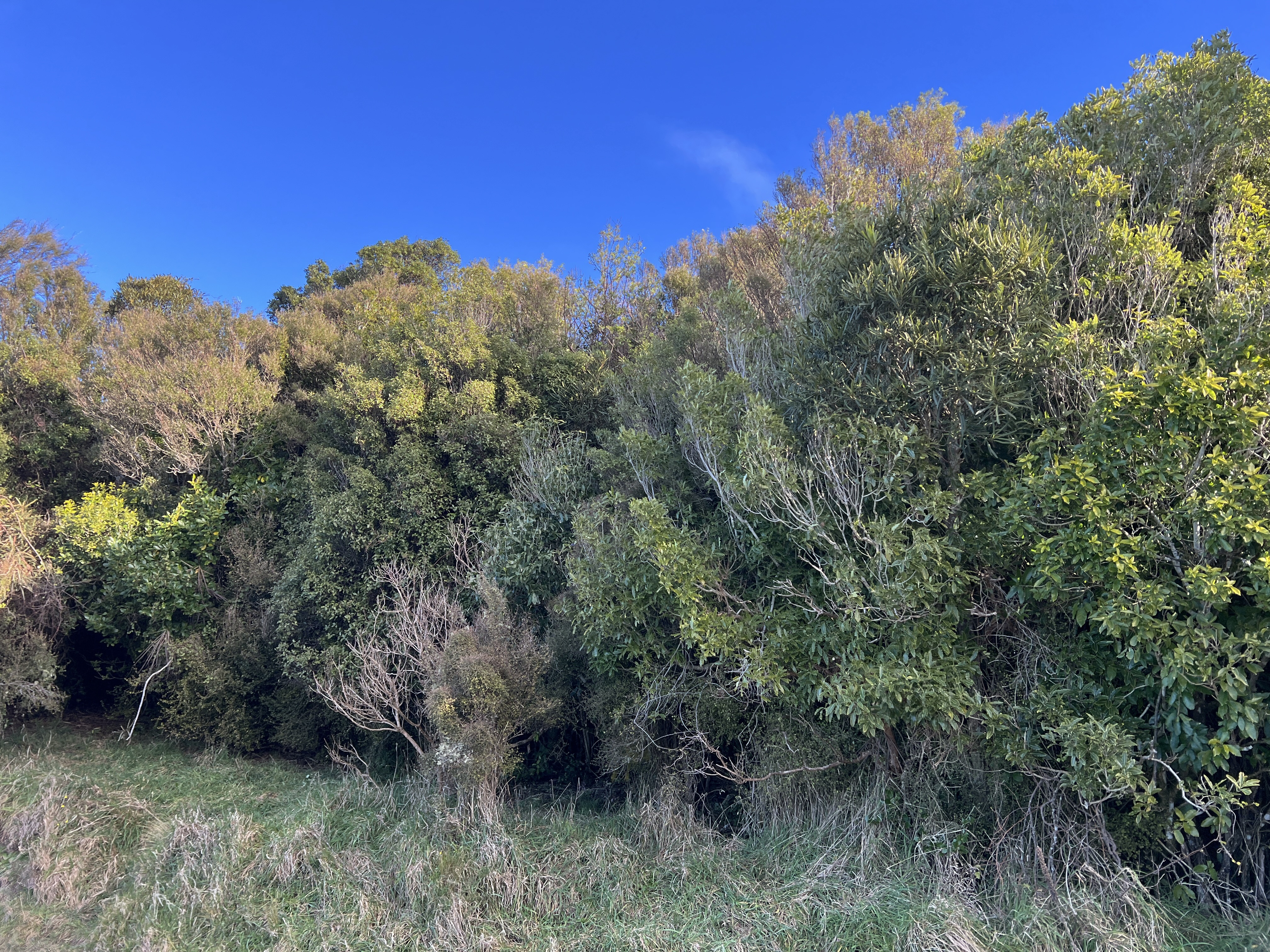

- Location within Banks Peninsula
- Location: Port Hills
- Nearest city: Christchurch
- Coordinates: 43°39′58″S 172°37′16″E
- Area: 10.9 hectares (27 acres)
- Elevation: 440 m (1,443.57 ft)
- Etymology: Named after Ahuriri Station
- Operator: Christchurch City Council

Ahuriri Scenic Reserve, also known as Ahuriri Bush Scenic Reserve, is a public scenic reserve in the Port Hills south of Christchurch, New Zealand. It sits on the west side of the Summit Road, south of Cooper's Knob at the head of the Ahuriri Valley. It is the most significant remnant of a forest type that once covered the Port Hills.

== History ==
The valley below the bush was farmed from the 1850s by the Rhodes brothers and was part of an extensive landholding named by them Ahuriri Station. When the Rhodes brothers ended their partnership in 1875 they sold the valley block to R.J.P. Fleming of Port Levy, who subdivided it and sold 1,300 hectares to R.M. Morten, who in turn handed Ahuriri over to one of his sons, Richard May Downes Morten. At this time there were two areas of native bush at Ahuriri Station: 80 hectares remained in the valley after extensive milling in the 19th century, and a smaller patch towards the skyline. Confusingly, both have been referred to as "Ahuriri Bush". The larger area is still in private hands, one of the biggest existing patches of privately-owned native forest on Banks Peninsula.

Beginning in 1900, politician Harry Ell ran a campaign to preserve access to walking tracks and the remnants of native bush on the Port Hills. In 1903 he was instrumental in getting the Scenery Preservation Act through Parliament. Ell had secured the purchase of Kennedys Bush, and by 1914 had erected a red stone tea house there and secured more reserve land around Cass Peak. In 1914 he approached Richard M.D. Morten and convinced him to present 10 hectares (25 acres) of the skyline bush to public, to be known as "Ahuriri Bush Reserve". The Summit Road was extended south from the reserve to Gebbies Pass in the early 1920s. A caretaker was appointed for Kennedy's Bush in 1920, who acted as a ranger for other Summit Road reserves, and prevented Ahuriri Bush from being damaged by fire in 1921.

In 1940 the Port Hills–Akaroa Summit Road Trust's authority over the bush was revoked, and it came under the authority of the Lands Department. The Christchurch City Council agreed in principle in 1941 to take over management of the bush and various other Summit Road reserves, if funding for maintenance could be secured. Ahuriri Bush was eventually vested in the Council in 1948, and is now a scenic reserve with an area of 10.9 hectares (27 acres). Two further areas in Ahuriri Valley—Ahuriri Tussock Reserve and Ahuriri Bush reserve—are on private land and were protected by QEII National Trust covenants in 1983.

== Flora ==
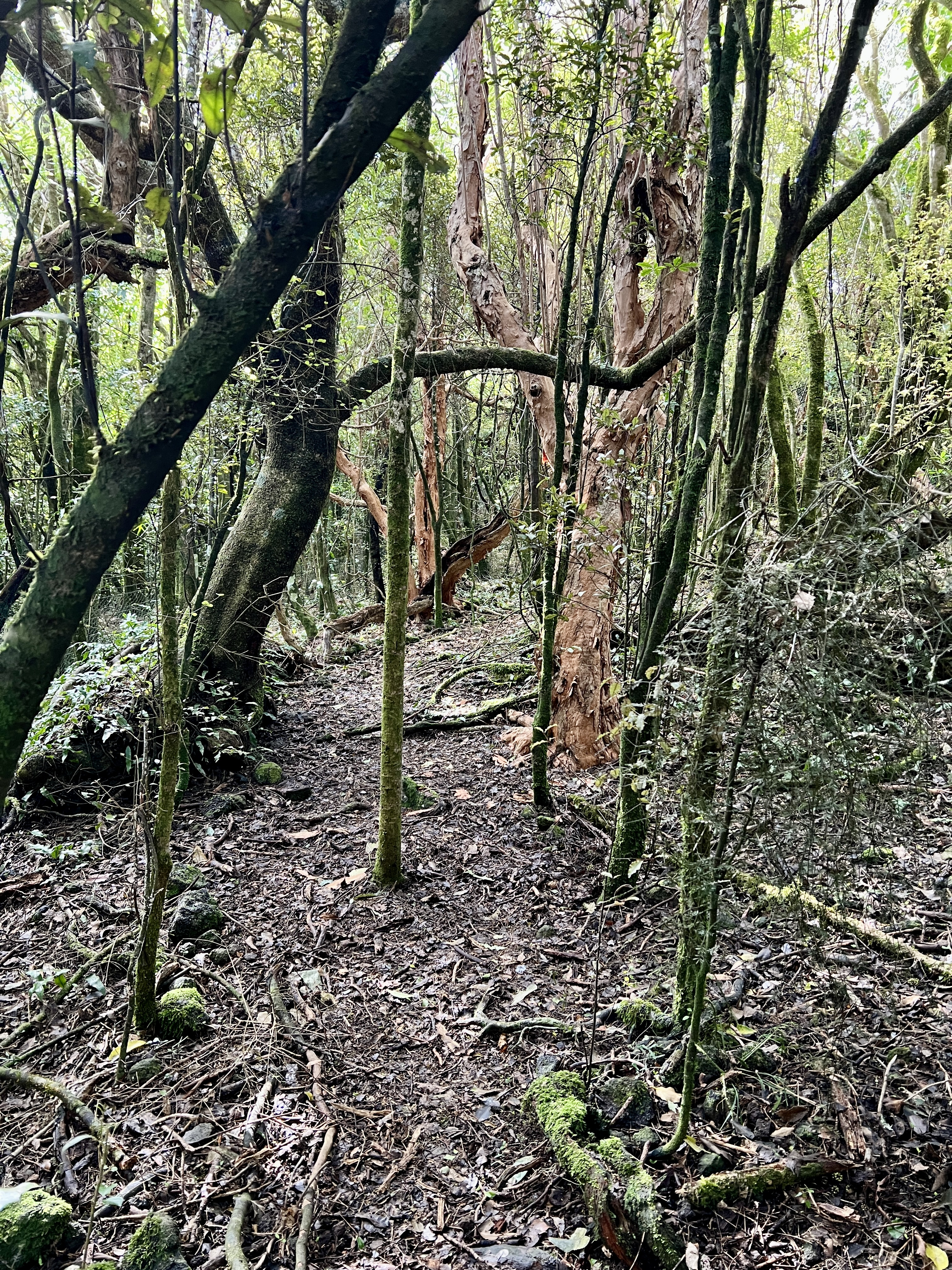
Forest interior

Ahuriri Scenic Reserve is sheltered from southerly winds and is exposed to northern sun and nor'westerly winds. It receives the highest rainfall of the Port Hills reserves: 1200 mm per year was recorded in the 1990s. The forest contains a few large trees that survived pre-European bush firest, mainly mataī (Prumnopitys taxifolia) trees but including several large kahikatea (Dacrycarpus dacrydioides), unusual for a comparatively-dry forest fragment. Most of the trees are second growth, and include horopito (Pseudowintera colorata), five-finger (Pseudopanax arboreus), māhoe (Melicytus ramiflorus), ribbonwood (Plagianthus regius), tree fuchsia (Fuchsia excorticata), kaikomako (Pennantia corymbosa), Coprosma rotundifolia, and mapou (Myrsine australis). Large numbers of ferns covering the forest floor. The bush has a notable population of the climbing groundsel Brachyglottis sciadophila. A 1971 survey by Kelly noted 90 species of flowering plants, conifers, and ferns.

Visch carried out a bryopohyte survey of the reserve in 1979 and noted "the variety and richness of the mosses, hepatics, and lichens that covered the bark and branches of nearly every tree, shrub and liana". He observed in particular the moss Tetraphidopsis pusilla growing on the bark of horopito and vines, and the endemic species Calyptrochaeta brownii.

When the reserve was created the forest contained open patches; by 1999 the remaining areas of bracken fern (Pteridium esculentum) were quickly regenerating into native forest.

== Conservation ==
When over twenty acres of forest was donated by Richard M.D. Morten in 1914, Harr Ell described it as " twenty acres of the finest bush on the hills", claiming (incorrectly) it was "practically in a virgin state". Ahuriri Bush is indeed the most significant remnant of podocarp–broadleaf forest on the Port Hills, with the highest ecological and scientific importance. It was assigned the highest conservation protection priority score in 1992 because of "the degree of local vegetation uniqueness, conditions of vegetation or quantity of regenerating native forest". It is now fully fenced, and retains some large trees and an understorey of regenerating plants. The Christchurch City Council in the 1990s decided not to encourage public use of the reserve and keep trails lightly defined. The reserve formerly had a stile and walking track, but around 1997 these were removed to deter public access; previously visitors would venture a short way into the bush and trample the vegetation. The reserve is now fenced to prevent access by sheep and cattle, and possum control is ongoing.

== See also ==
- Harry Ell
- Conservation in New Zealand
- Banks Peninsula
