= Jollies Bush =

Conservation reserve in the Port Hills south of Christchurch, New Zealand

Jollies Bush Scenic Reserve
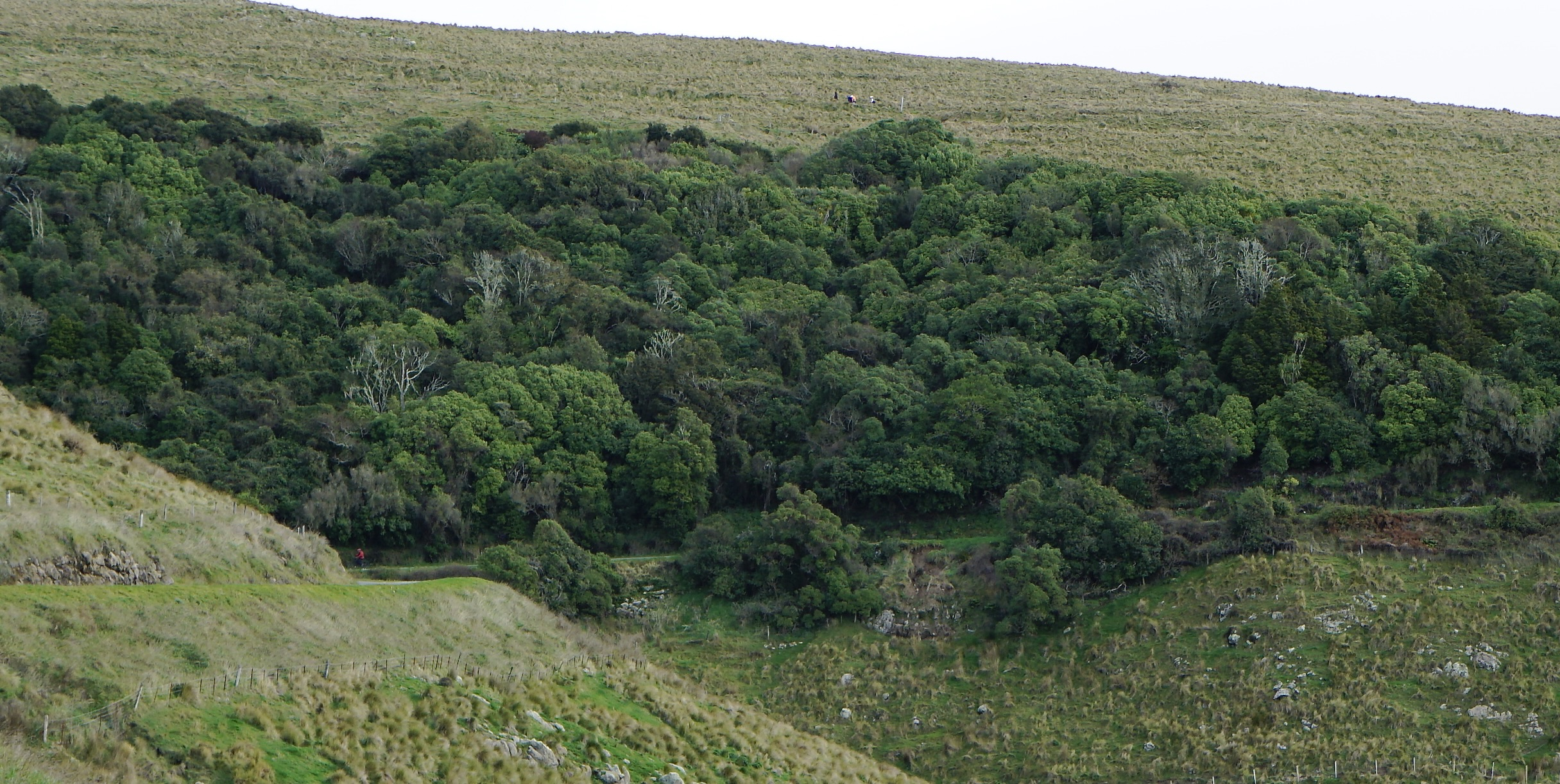
- Viewed from Summit Road

- Location within Christchurch, New Zealand
- Location: Port Hills
- Nearest city: Christchurch
- Coordinates: 43°35′13″S 172°44′10″E
- Area: 1.1 hectares (2.7 acres)
- Elevation: 300 m (984.25 ft)
- Etymology: Named after Edward Jollie
- Operator: Christchurch City Council

Jollies Bush Scenic Reserve, usually known simply as Jollies Bush, is a public scenic reserve in the Port Hills southeast of Christchurch, New Zealand. It sits beside the Summit Road on the slopes of Mount Pleasant, above the suburb of Sumner. The reserve is one of the smallest remaining on the Port Hills, and contains a mixture of locally-native plants and species from other parts of New Zealand.

== History ==
Edward Jollie was an early Canterbury Provincial Council surveyor and secretary of public works, involved in surveying the proposed settlement of Christchurch. An entry in the journal of Charles Torlesse from 14 August 1849 states that Jollie, who had just arrived in Canterbury, had found a site for his house in a gully beside the road to Sumner, and three Australian immigrants (or "shagroons") built it for him. Jollie's cottage had a stream nearby and access to the bush for firewood, and he lived there in November 1849 while laying out the town plan for the subdivision of Sumner, as well as Lyttelton and Christchurch. His plan was never adopted, as survey work ceased in March 1850 for lacks of funds, and the Sumner subdivision was declared rural land. Jollie remained for another year as a contract worker before moving to Nelson and drove sheep to Canterbury over the pass that now bears his name.

Around 1850 the bush stretched from its present site—a gully just above the present-day Summit Road—as far down as the Sumner Road. It was regularly harvested for firewood and building timber. In 1851, the first year of the Canterbury settlement, eight licences were issued to itinerant loggers ("bushwhackers") on Mount Pleasant—likely referring to Jollies Bush. Arthur Dudley Dobson in his Reminiscences recalls that he and his brother in the 1850s obtained most of their firewood "from the top of Mt Pleasant at the head of Jollies Gully, where there was a small bush". They felled trees, dragged them out with a bullock "down the spur where the Richmond Hill golf links are now, and threw them over the cliff onto our land at the bottom".

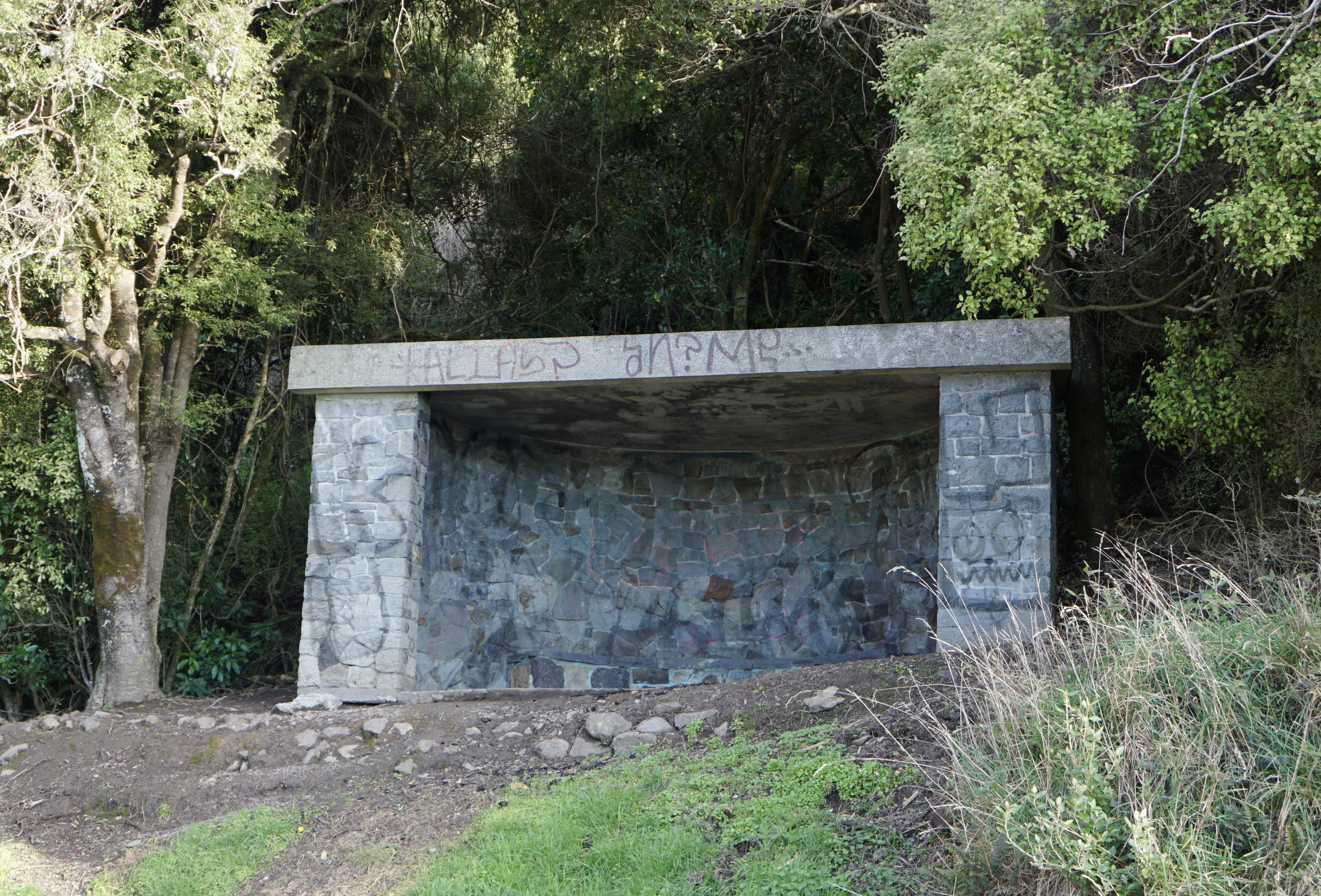
Shelter at Summit Road

Beginning in 1900, politician Harry Ell ran a campaign to preserve access to walking tracks and the remnants of native bush on the Port Hills. In 1903 he was instrumental in getting the Scenery Preservation Act through Parliament. Ell approached landowners Arthur Morten and Richard May Downes Morten for permission to extend the newly created Summit Road through their properties, and they not only agreed but added 24 hectares (59 acres) of reserve land, including the summit of Mount Pleasant and Jollies Bush. By 1918, the bush was administered by the newly created Summit Road and Reserves Association, who noted its area was "2 acres 2 roods 35 perches".

Jollies Bush is now a scenic reserve administered by the Christchurch City Council with an area of 1.1 hectares (2.7 acres) and a perimeter of 668 metres (2,192 ft), making it one of the smallest remaining scenic reserves in the Port Hills. The Summit Road entrance has a stone shelter with concrete roof and a track that loops through the reserve.

== Ecology ==
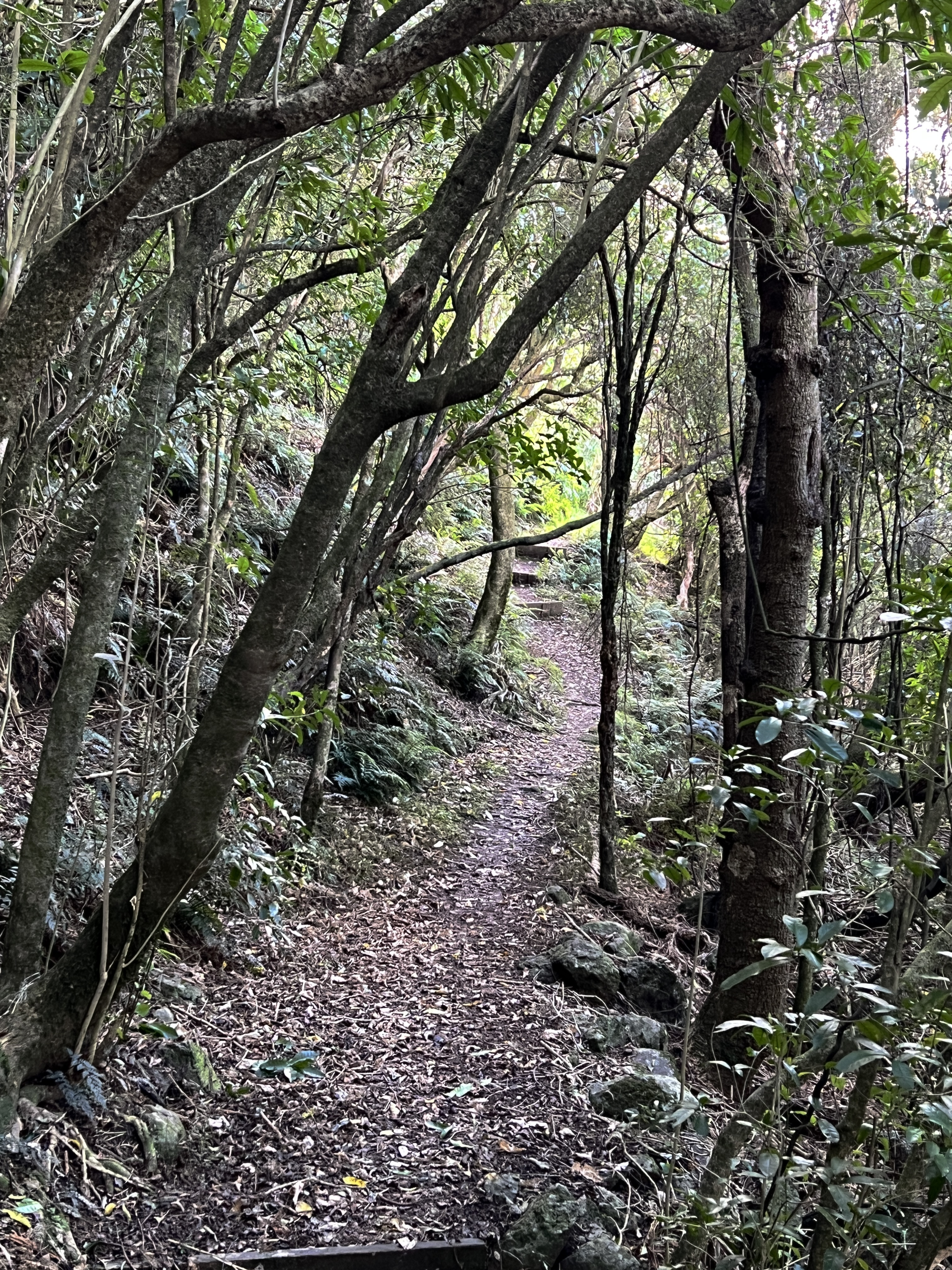
Māhoe grove inside the bush

In its early days, the bush was predominantly composed of ribbonwood (Plagianthus regius) and māhoe (Melicytus ramiflorus). By 1918, the Summit Road and Reserves Association noted it was "thickly covered with ngaios" (Myoporum laetum), and was unfenced and grazed by stock—ngaio is unpalatable to livestock and can persist in cattle pasture. The Association judged that the reserve's undergrowth would recover once it was fenced.

The mixture of second-growth forest in the bush was supplemented by deliberate planting, often of species native to New Zealand but not to the Port Hills. In the 1930s and 1940s several specimens of mountain beech (Nothofagus menziesii) were planted, as well as rangiora (Brachyglottis repanda) from the North Island. In recent years, volunteers have planted local species around Jollies Bush—notably harakeke (Phormium tenax) in 2017—with the aim of creating a forest corridor stretching from Sumner up to the bush and over the ridge into Lyttelton.
