= Ellangowan Scenic Reserve =

Conservation reserve on Banks Peninsula, New Zealand

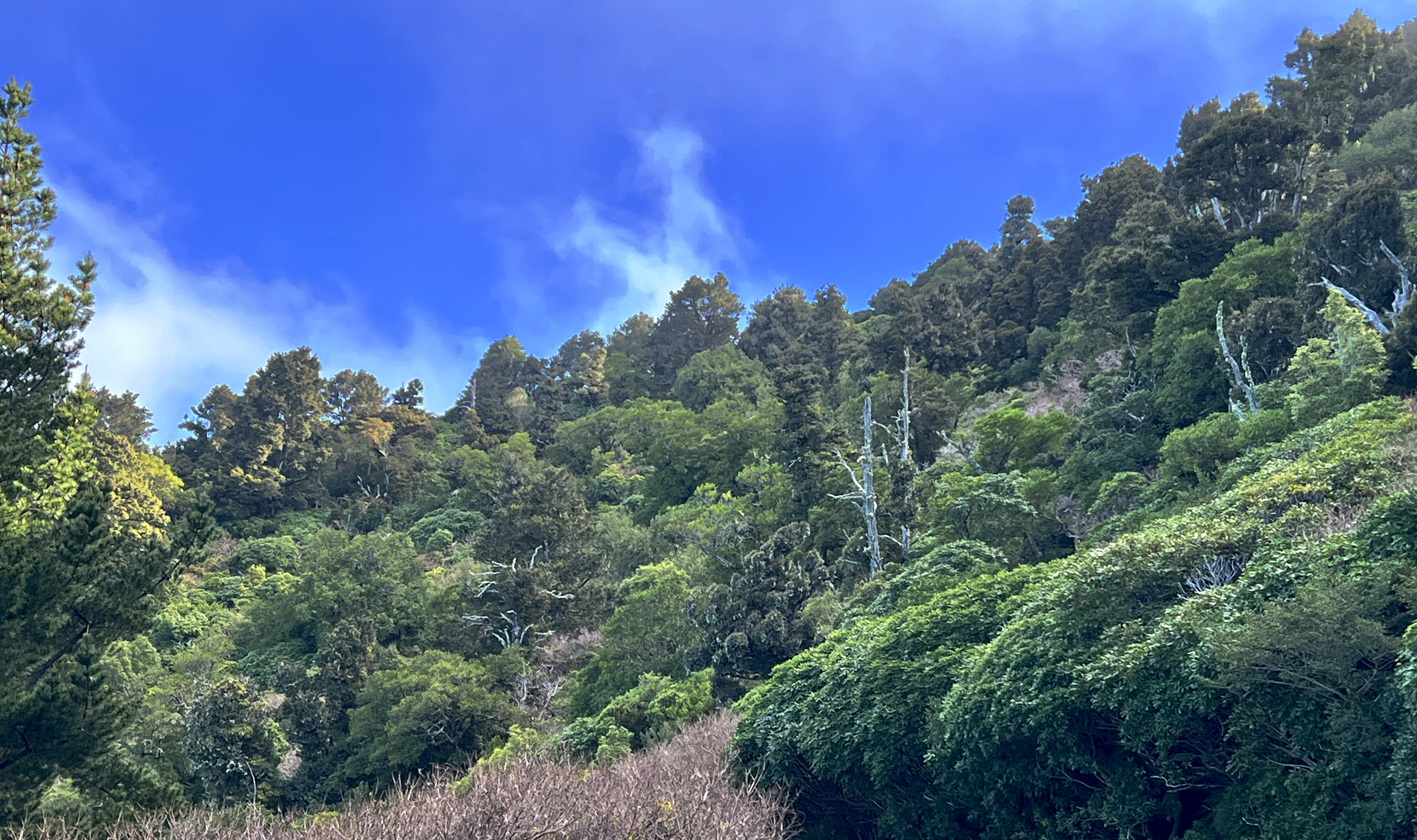

- Location within Banks Peninsula
- Location: Banks Peninsula
- Nearest city: Christchurch
- Coordinates: 43°47′17″S 173°02′17″E
- Area: 322 hectares (800 acres)
- Elevation: 600 m (1,968.50 ft)
- Created: 1973
- Etymology: From Ellangowan, the Moore family farm
- Operator: Department of Conservation (New Zealand)
- Designation: Scenic Reserve

Ellangowan Scenic Reserve is a public scenic reserve on Banks Peninsula, New Zealand, near Akaroa at the head of Hickory Bay. It is notable for having the northernmost naturally-occurring red beech (Nothofagus fusca) on Banks Peninsula.

== Geography ==
This 322-hectare (800-acre) reserve is situated in eastern Banks Peninsula, next to the Summit Road, 1.2 kilometres (0.75 mi) east of the junction above Akaroa known as the Cabstand. Its southern and eastern borders follow Hickory Bay road, and it extends along the hill slopes along the northern bank of the Ellangowan Stream some distance towards Hickory Bay. A car park at western edge of the reserve is approximately 680 metres (2,230 ft) above sea level, and a 1.2 km (0.75 mi) track climbs to a 739 m (0.459 mi) escarpment with notable views of the coast, before making a descent through mixed podocarp–southern beech forest to the road. Andy Dennis noted this was the shortest and easiest track to a scenic viewpoint of any of the Summit Road scenic reserves, with views into Goughs Bay, Hickory Bay, and Otanerito. The sheltered moister faces of the reserve are well vegetated, receiving approximately 1600 mm of rainfall a year.

== History ==
In 1886 Alexander Roberts bought 3,000 acres (1,200 ha) of land in Hickory Bay and began clearing it, growing cocksfoot for seed and running 5000 sheep and hundreds of head of cattle. He sold most of the land in 1898, and one of the buyers was Charles Moore of Okains Bay, who farmed there with his sons William, Arthur, and Harold. William in turn ran a farm with his sons William and Charles, using a mobile cocksfoot threshing machine well into the 1920s. The farm run by Charles's son John Moore, now 1,350 acres (550 ha) was named Ellangowan; John Moore began breeding Perendale sheep in 1965, and in 1968 established a stud of 200 ewes. In 1970 the Moore family gifted the core of the forest reserve to the public, and in 1973 it was formally gazetted as Ellangowan Scenic Reserve, named after the family farm. Moore sold the farm in 1978 and retired to Tai Tapu.

The area of the reserve in 1973 was 7.86 hectares (19.4 acres) of forested bluff bounded on three sides by the Summit Road and Hickory Bay Road. This was gradually expanded to 22 hectares (54 acres), and in 2002 nearly 300 hectares (740 acres) of land was acquired by the Nature Heritage Fund alongside the reserve. The merged public conservation land made Ellangowan the largest scenic reserve on Banks Peninsula.

== Ecology ==
=== Flora ===
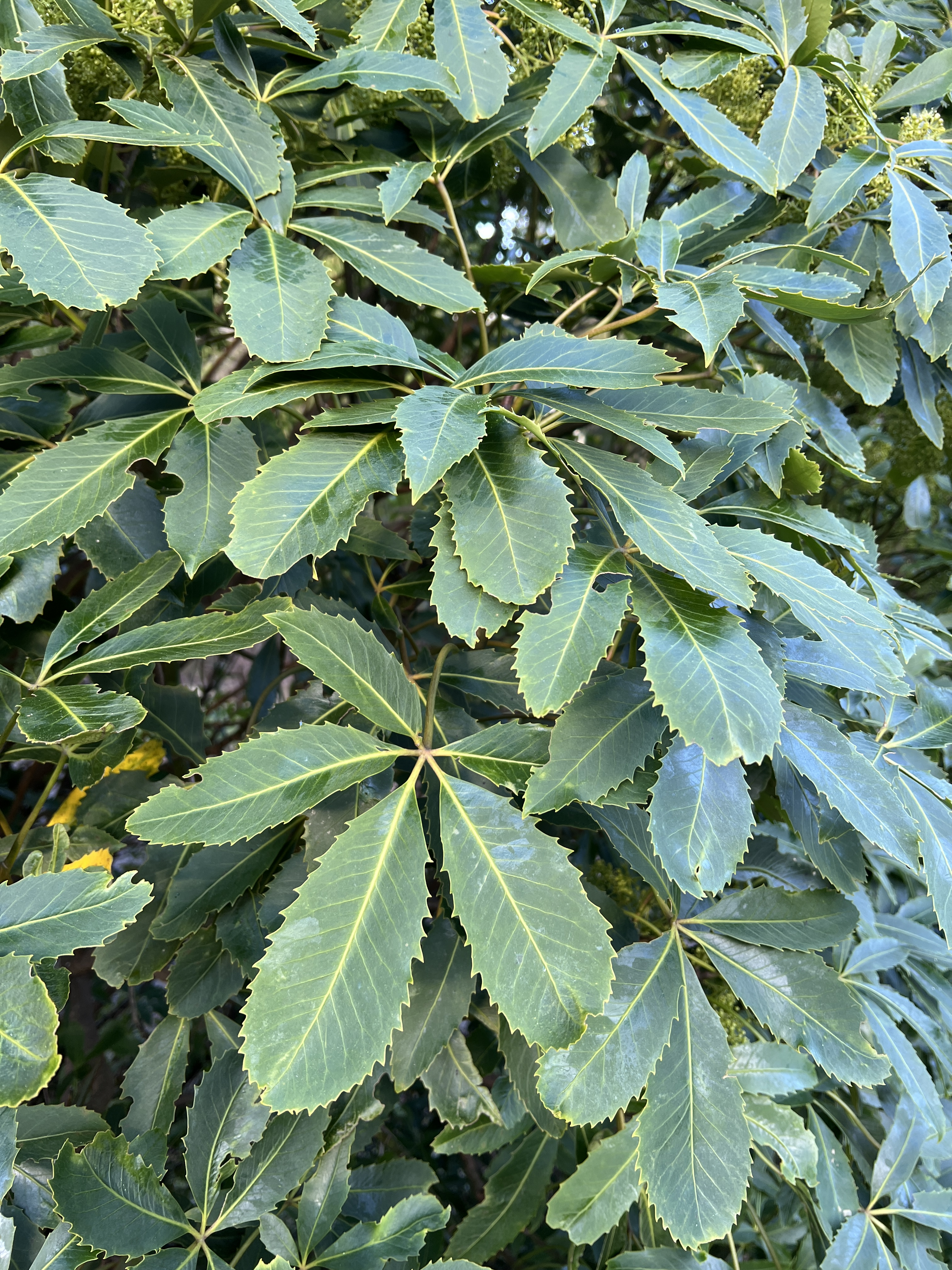
Mountain five-finger

The forest canopy of Ellangowan Scenic Reserve is a mixture of podocarps (mostly mountain tōtara, Podocarpus laetus) and scattered individual red beech (Nothofagus fusca). The red beech here mark the northernmost extent of the species' distribution on Banks Peninsula, and are the most accessible naturally-occurring trees in the area. Smaller trees include tree fuchsia (Fuchsia excorticata), lancewood (Pseudopanax arboreus), lemonwood (Pittosporum tenuifolium), mountain five finger (Pseudopanax colensoi), pate (Schefflera digitata), broadleaf / kāpuka (Griselinia littoralis) and tōī / mountain cabbage tree (Cordyline indivisa). The threatened species Coprosma wallii and the Banks Peninsula endemic Veronica strictissima are also found in the reserve. Veronica strictissima is one of the most abundant shrubs along the ridgeline, and the rocky bluffs of Ellangowan Scenic Reserve are one of the best places to see the endemic Banks Peninsula sun hebe Veronica lavaudiana, which flowers in November and December.

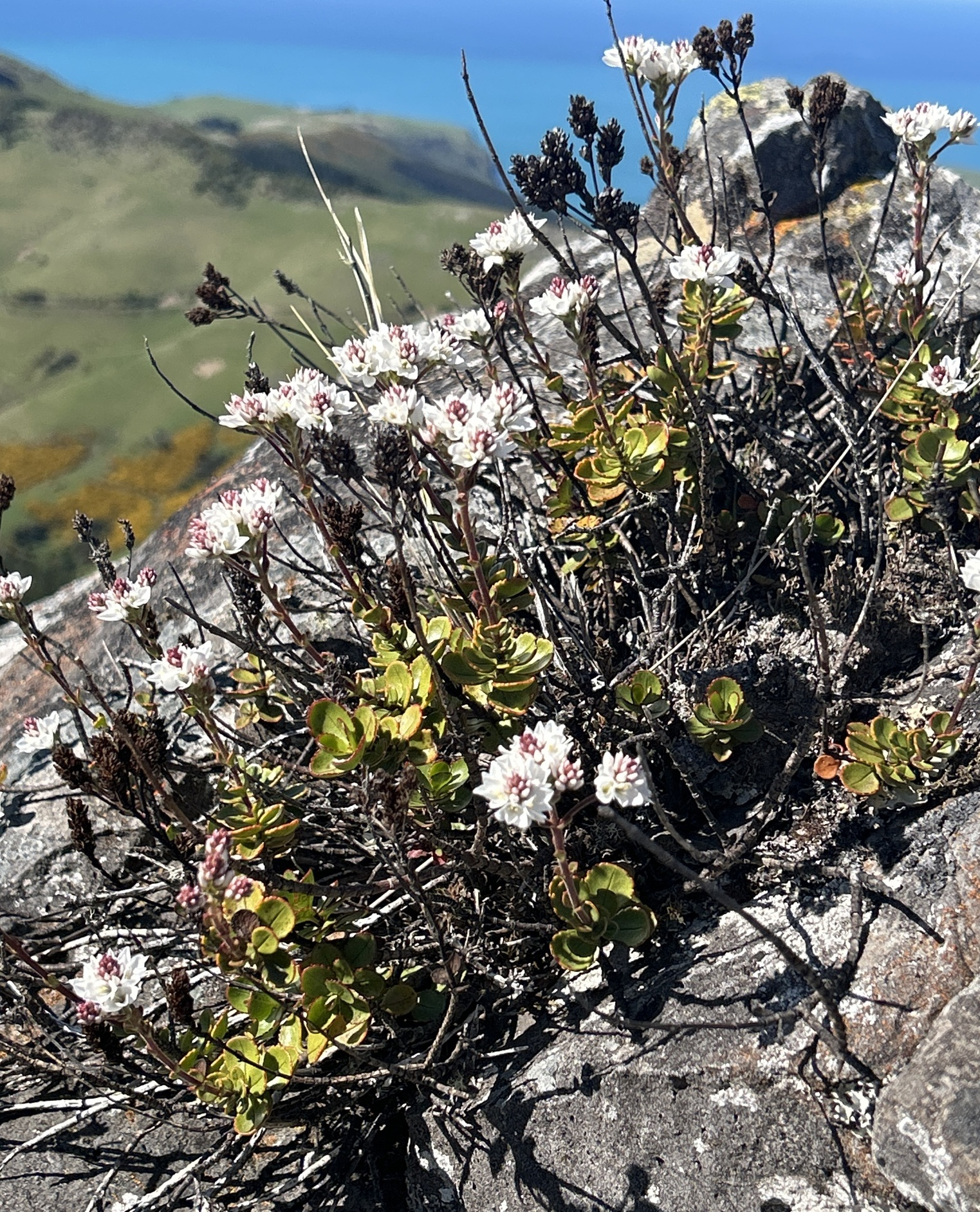
Veronica lavaudiana

The steep bluff at the centre of the reserve has open-country and rock-dwelling plants, surrounded by snow tussock (Chionochloa rigida) grassland. Snow tussock grows on the exposed bluff, together with the bush tussock Chionochloa conspicua, small shrubs like Coprosma rhamnoides and the bush snowberry Gaultheria antipoda, and herbs such as mountain flax (Phormium cookianum), kopoti (Anisotome aromatica), yellow rock daisy (Senecio lagopus), and the clubmoss Phlegmariurus varius. This bluff vegetation is a good representation of the grassland present on Banks Peninsula when all but the steepest and most exposed slopes were covered with podocarp-dominated forest.

At the lower edge of the reserve are roadside banks on which grow Astelia, Dracophyllum acerosum, Veronica strictissima, the shield fern Polystichum vestitum, and bush snowberry. Wilding pine trees are present across the reserve.

=== Fauna ===
Native birds present at Ellangowan include kererū (Hemiphaga novaeseelandiae), korimako / bellbirds (Anthornis melanura), pīpīwharauroa / shining cuckoos (Chrysococcyx lucidus), miromiro / South Island tomtits (Petroica macrocephala), and kakaruai / South Island robins (Petroica australis).

== See also ==
- Conservation in New Zealand
- Banks Peninsula
