= Hoani Paraone Tunuiarangi =

Hoani Paraone Tunuiarangi (1843 – 29 March 1933), referred to as Major Brown by Europeans in later life, was a notable New Zealand tribal leader, guide, interpreter, assessor, politician, and writer. Of Māori descent, he identified with the Ngāti Kahungunu and Rangitāne iwi. He was born in Whakatomotomo, Wairarapa, New Zealand in about 1843. From 1892, he was a member of Te Kotahitanga, the autonomous Māori Parliament. One of six candidates in the 1893 election for the Eastern Maori electorate, he came second to the incumbent, Wi Pere. He was one of the owners of Lake Wairarapa and took a stance supportive of the government's view of land ownership. His support was acknowledged by him being appointed captain of a volunteer force, and he was to train 18 Māori as a guard of honour for Queen Victoria's Diamond Jubilee. Richard Seddon, Tunuiarangi, and his guard of honour travelled to London on the Ruahine. In conjunction with Wi Pere and James Carroll, he had secretly prepared a petition concerning the remaining land held by Māori to remain in their ownership in perpetuity. Scottish MP John McAusland Denny presented the petition on Tunuiarangi's behalf to Joseph Chamberlain, and Tunuiarangi received an invitation from the Parliament of the United Kingdom to explain his concerns. The petition caused great embarrassment to the Liberal Government of New Zealand, and is regarded as one of the reasons of the government passing the Native Lands Settlement and Administration Bill 1898, the precursor to the Maori Lands Administration Act 1900.

From 1904 until 1906, Tunuiarangi was a member of the Scenery Preservation Commission which investigated scenic areas and historic places that should be preserved by the government.

From 1912, he lived in Carterton. After a long illness, he died on 29 March 1933, and was survived by a daughter and son from the first of his three wives.
