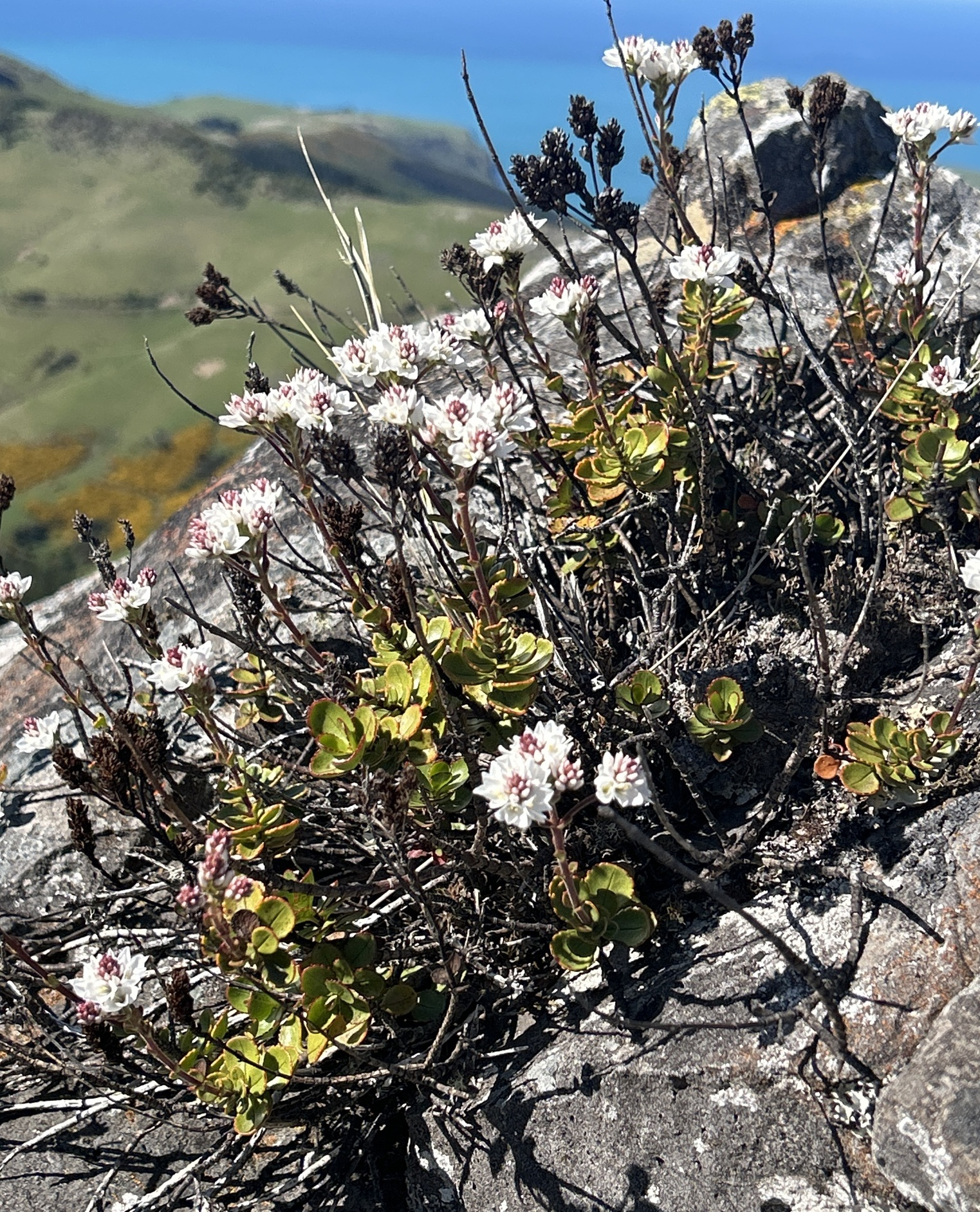

Conservation status
- Declining (NZ TCS)

Scientific classification
- Kingdom: Plantae
- Clade: Tracheophytes
- Clade: Angiosperms
- Clade: Eudicots
- Clade: Asterids
- Order: Lamiales
- Family: Plantaginaceae
- Genus: Veronica
- Species: V. lavaudiana

Binomial name
- Veronica lavaudiana Raoul

Synonyms
- Hebe lavaudiana (Raoul)Andersen; Heliohebe lavaudiana (Raoul) Garn.-Jones; Parahebe lavaudiana (Raoul) Heads

= Veronica lavaudiana =

Species of plant

Veronica lavaudiana, one of the sun hebes, is a species of flowering plant in the family Plantaginaceae. It is endemic to Banks Peninsula, South Island, New Zealand. The conservation status of V. lavaudiana is At Risk - Declining under the New Zealand Threat Classification System. It is morphologically most similar to the other sun hebe species, V. hulkeana, V. raoulii, V. pentasepala, V. scrupea and V. maccaskillii.

== Taxonomy ==
Veronia lavaudiana is a species in the family Plantaginaceae. It was originally described in 1846 by French naturalist Étienne Raoul as Veronica lavaudiana. The species was transferred to the genus and Parahebe in 1994 by New Zealand botanist Michael Heads and then to Heliohebe in 1996 by New Zealand botanist Phil Garnock-Jones, but since 2007 it has been recognised as Veronica lavaudiana by many botanists in a more broadly circumscribed Veronica.

The lectotype specimen was collected by Raoul on Banks Peninsula and is housed at herbarium of the National Museum of Natural History in Paris.

Morphologically it is most simlar to the other sun hebe species, V. hulkeana, V. raoulii, V. pentasepala, V. scrupea and V. maccaskillii, all of which were previously placed in the informal group Hebe 'Paniculatae' or the genus Heliohebe. V. lavaudiana can be distinguished from the other sun hebe species by the combination of leaves dull and greater than 1 cm wide, a compact inflorescence with long glandular hairs, and corollas greater than 1 cm in diameter.

== Conservation status ==
The species is listed as At Risk - Declining in the most recent assessment (2023) of the New Zealand Threatened Classification for plants. Its status was unchanged from the 2017 assessment (and that of 2012, where it was listed as Heliohebe lavaudiana).

In addition to qualifier RR ("Range restricted), V. lavaudiana also has the qualifier CI ("Climate impact"). The CI qualifier has been used by the Department of Conservation since 2021 to flag species in its conservation assessments that are "adversely affected by long-term climate trends and/or extreme climatic events."

== Distribution and habitat ==
Veronica lavaudiana is endemic to the South Island of New Zealand. It is found only on Banks Peninsula on exposed, sunny cliff faces and rocky outcrops. Threats include non-native plants such as gorse that invade and overshadow their rocky habitats.

Flowers

Fruits

Leaves

Rocky cliff habitat

Habit

== Biochemistry ==
Like other sun hebes, Veronica lavaudiana has a simple flavonoid profile. Together with V. hulkeana and V. raoulii, its profile is characterised by luteolin caffeoylglycoside, whereas the profiles of V. pentasepala and V. scrupea have 6-hydroxyluteolin dihexoside.

In another study of the biochemistry of V. lavaudiana, 11 iridoid glucosides, mannitol, the carbohydrate ester hebitol II, and four phenylethanoid glycoside esters were isolated and identified.
