= Maungaraki =

Suburb of Lower Hutt, New Zealand

Coordinates: 41°12′30″S 174°52′44″E

- Suburb
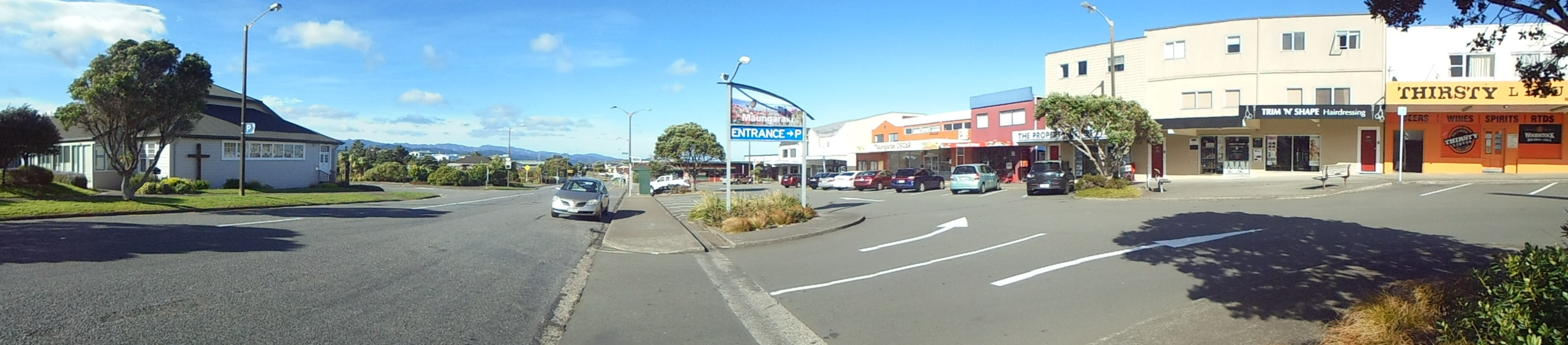
- Maungaraki's shopping centre (right) in 2018, with Maungaraki Baptist Church (left)
- Interactive map of Maungaraki
- Country: New Zealand
- City: Lower Hutt
- Local authority: Hutt City Council
- Electoral ward: Western
- Established: 1960s

Area
  - Land: 212 ha (520 acres)

Population (June 2025)
  - Total: 4,220
  - Density: 1,990/km^{2} (5,160/sq mi)

		Normandale
	Maungaraki	Lower Hutt CBD
Korokoro	Petone	Alicetown

Maungaraki is a suburb of Lower Hutt. It is one of several Lower Hutt suburbs on the western hills of the Hutt Valley. It contains the largest suburban development on the Hutt Valley's western escarpment that runs along the Wellington Fault.

Maungaraki translated from Māori means "northern mountain". This may reference the Māori pā to the south that once stood at Pito-one.

In 2021, Maungaraki was chosen by national news publication Stuff as the best suburb to live in the Wellington region due in part to high sunshine hours, excellent schooling, panoramic views, a diverse population and low crime.

== Features of the suburb ==
The suburb has a shopping centre, a baptist church, and a community hall that is managed by the Maungaraki Community Association. The Church building was relocated from the old NZ Railways works at Moera.

There is one school in the suburb: Maungaraki School, a full primary school on Dowse Drive formed in 1999 by the merger of Puketiro and Otonga schools. The school's library doubles as a community public library outside of school hours. Maungaraki also has a kindergarten and playcentre.

Much of Maungaraki falls within Belmont Regional Park, and there are walking tracks from the suburb into the park. Korokoro Dam and its waterfall are both within the park and within Maungaraki.

The main entrance to Percy Scenic Reserve is located within the suburb. The reserve features nature plants, walking tracks and a waterfall.

== History ==
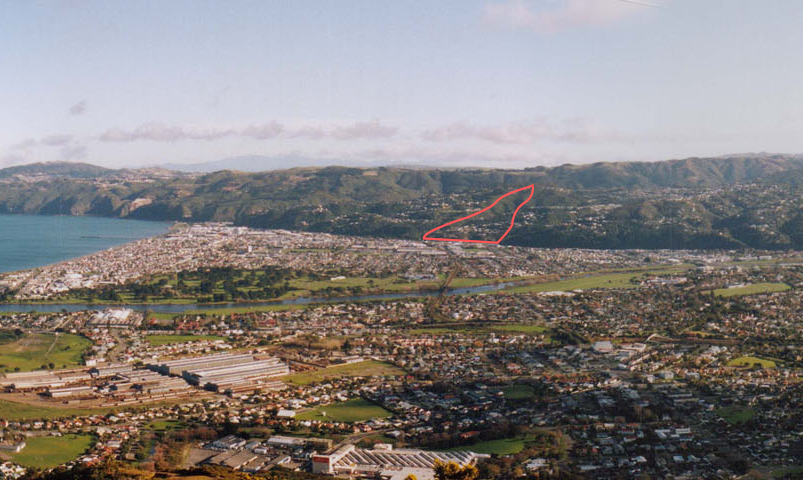
Maungaraki's location in Lower Hutt. It is bordered by State Highway 2 to the south and reaches Mt Belmont in the north.

Housing increased rapidly in the area during the 1960s, at the time it was the largest local-government subdivision in New Zealand.

The main road through the suburb, Dowse Drive, honours the Lower Hutt Mayor Percy Dowse (in office: 1950–1970), who led the development of housing in Maungaraki. Most of the other roads in the suburb feature the names of trees. Reese Jones Grove is named after Thomas and Myrtle Reese Jones, a Korokoro farming couple who sold a proportion of their land in Maungaraki to the Lower Hutt City Council in 1957.

Puketiro School opened in 1967 and was situated where Maungaraki School is now. Otonga School opened in 1977 and most of the land which Otonga School occupied is now private housing.

== Demographics ==
Maungaraki statistical area covers 2.12 km^{2} (0.82 sq mi). It had an estimated population of 4,220 as of June 2025, with a population density of 1,991 people per km^{2}.

Historical population
Year	Pop.	±% p.a.
2006	3,552	—
2013	3,777	+0.88%
2018	3,987	+1.09%
2023	4,005	+0.09%

Maungaraki had a population of 4,005 in the 2023 New Zealand census, an increase of 18 people (0.5%) since the 2018 census, and an increase of 228 people (6.0%) since the 2013 census. There were 2,037 males, 1,950 females, and 18 people of other genders in 1,392 dwellings. 4.3% of people identified as LGBTIQ+. The median age was 38.4 years (compared with 38.1 years nationally). There were 783 people (19.6%) aged under 15 years, 696 (17.4%) aged 15 to 29, 1,986 (49.6%) aged 30 to 64, and 540 (13.5%) aged 65 or older.

People could identify as more than one ethnicity. The results were 71.1% European (Pākehā); 10.6% Māori; 5.2% Pasifika; 23.7% Asian; 1.6% Middle Eastern, Latin American and African New Zealanders (MELAA); and 2.8% other, which includes people giving their ethnicity as "New Zealander". English was spoken by 95.8%, Māori by 2.5%, Samoan by 1.2%, and other languages by 23.4%. No language could be spoken by 2.2% (e.g. too young to talk). New Zealand Sign Language was known by 0.6%. The percentage of people born overseas was 32.0, compared with 28.8% nationally.

Religious affiliations were 27.7% Christian, 6.0% Hindu, 1.5% Islam, 0.2% Māori religious beliefs, 1.6% Buddhist, 0.3% New Age, 0.1% Jewish, and 2.4% other religions. People who answered that they had no religion were 55.4%, and 4.7% of people did not answer the census question.

Of those at least 15 years old, 1,194 (37.1%) people had a bachelor's or higher degree, 1,503 (46.6%) had a post-high school certificate or diploma, and 534 (16.6%) people exclusively held high school qualifications. The median income was $59,100, compared with $41,500 nationally. 735 people (22.8%) earned over $100,000 compared to 12.1% nationally. The employment status of those at least 15 was 1,935 (60.1%) full-time, 432 (13.4%) part-time, and 54 (1.7%) unemployed.

== Education ==
Maungaraki School is a co-educational state primary school for Year 1 to 8 students, with a roll of 358 as of July 2026.
