= Percy Scenic Reserve =

Botanic garden in Lower Hutt, New Zealand

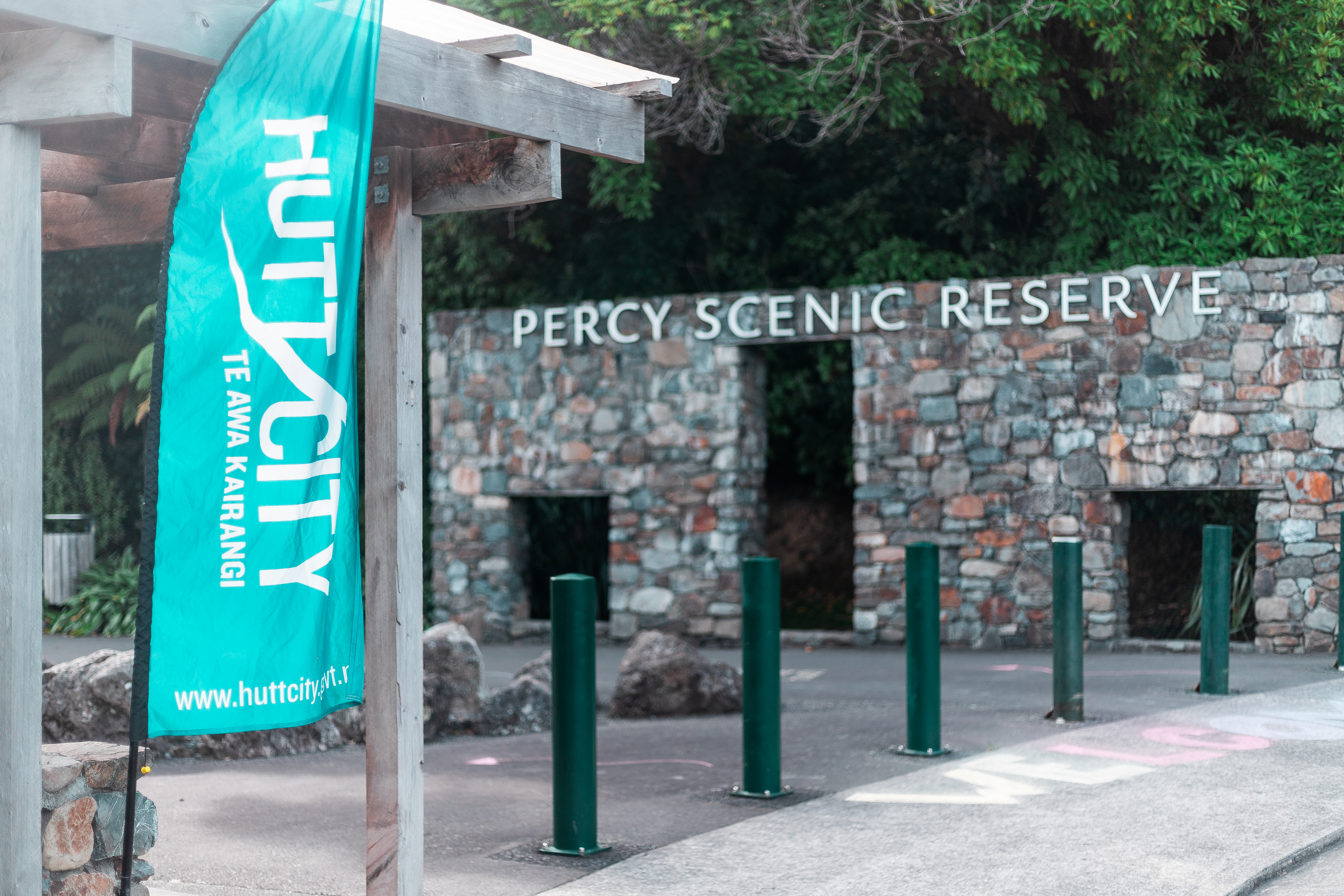
- Percy Scenic Reserve Entrance
- Interactive map of Percy Scenic Reserve
- Type: Ex situ conservation collection and botanical garden
- Location: Lower Hutt, New Zealand
- Coordinates: 41°12′45″S 174°52′30″E
- Area: 16.93 hectares (41.8 acres)
- Established: 1949
- Opened: 6 February 1949
- Operator: Hutt City Council
- Website: www.huttcity.govt.nz/environment-and-sustainability/parks-and-sportsgrounds/parks,-gardens-and-reserves/percy-scenic-reserve

Percy Scenic Reserve is a botanic garden and bush reserve located in Maungaraki in Lower Hutt, New Zealand.

== Overview ==
Percy Scenic Reserve is a public botanic garden with an ex-situ native plant collection dedicated to New Zealand native plants from coastal areas, alpine habitats, wetlands and offshore islands. The reserve comprises 16.93 hectares (41.8 acres) of parks, ponds, and forest. It also connects onto adjacent Frank Cameron Park.

Percy Scenic Reserve is owned by the Department of Conservation and managed by the Hutt City Council.

== Location and access ==
The gardens are located at 5 Dowse Drive, Maungaraki. There is parking at the Dowse Drive entrance for cars, campervans and coaches. It is a short walk north of the Petone train station. Part of the reserve also falls within the boundaries of the suburb of Korokoro.

There is a path suitable for wheelchairs from Dowse drive to the main lawns and duck pond.

The park open daily between sunrise and sunset, and entry is free.

== History ==
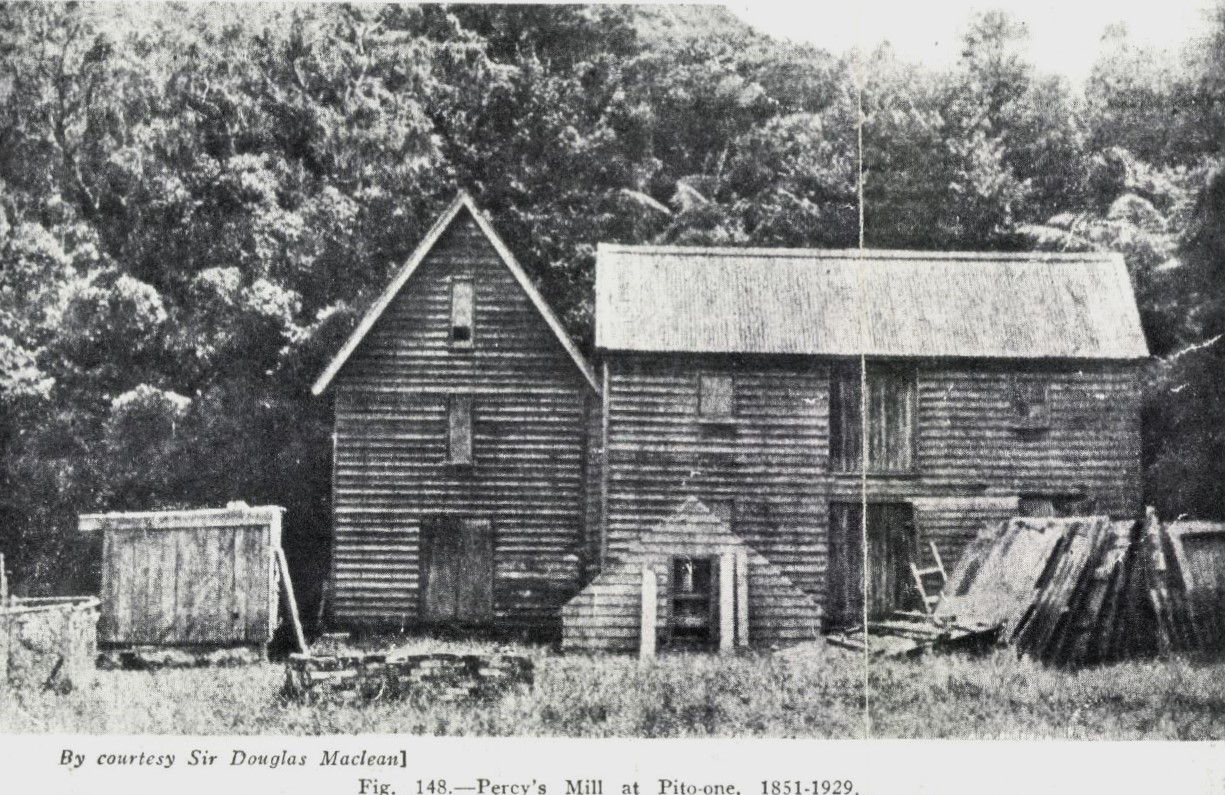
Percy's Mill at Pito-One 1851-1929

Joseph Hewlett Percy arrived in Petone with his family in 1841 and soon after began construction of their home and mills in the area.

== Visitor attractions ==
=== Waterfall ===
The waterfall on the Percy Stream that flows into the Duck Pond and was used to drive the Percy Family Flour Mill.

=== Duck Pond ===
The original pond created to drive the Percy family flour mill.

=== Wētā Cave ===
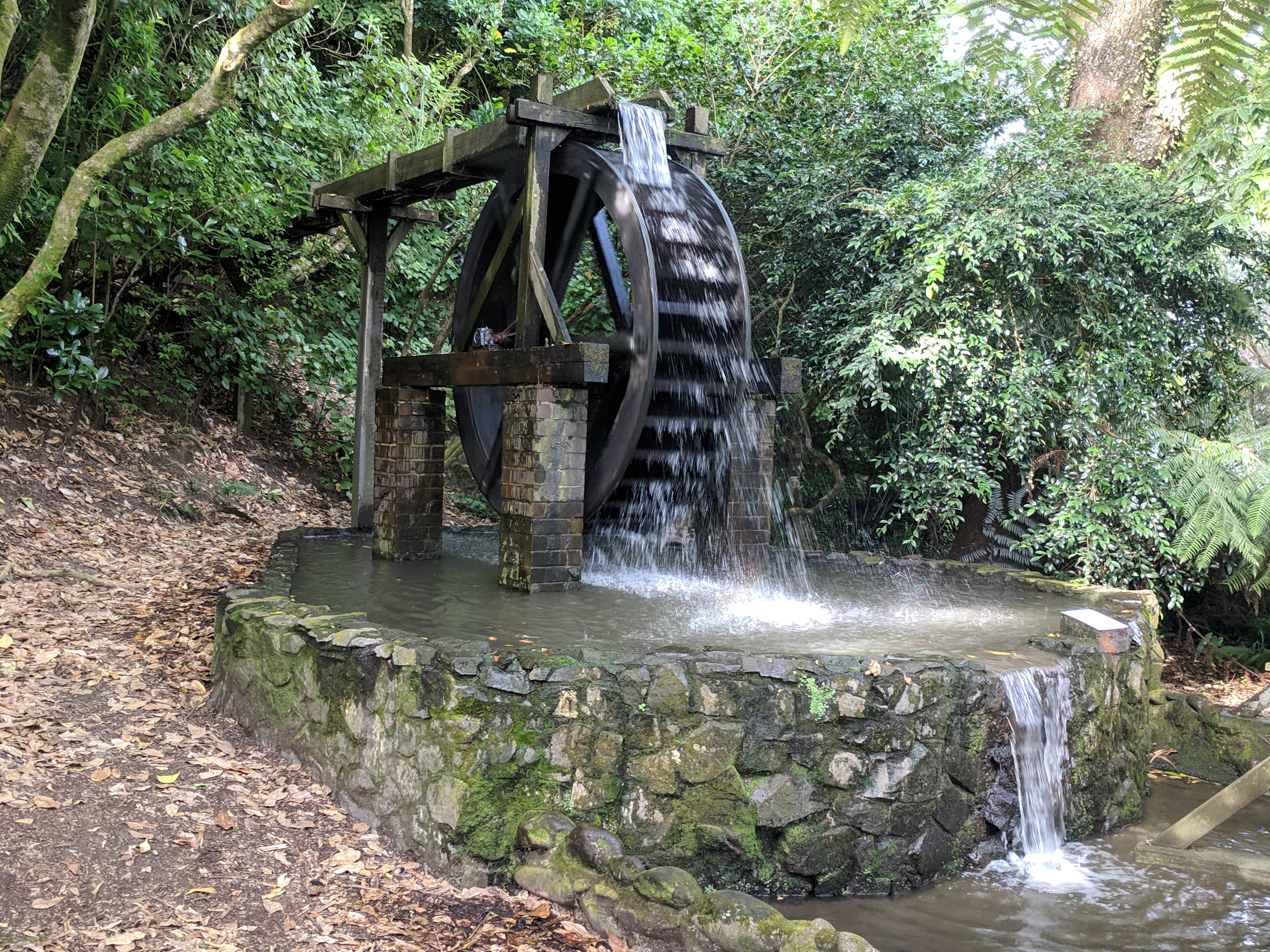
Waterwheel at Percy Scenic Reserve

=== Waterwheel ===
Memorial Waterwheel of the Percy Family Flour Mill.

=== Lookout and "Ratanui" ===
The Empty Site of Sir James Hector's Home.

=== Bush walks and tracks ===
There are walks and trails within the forest and gardens to suit a range of ages and abilities. Good walking footwear and is recommended for the Waterfall track.

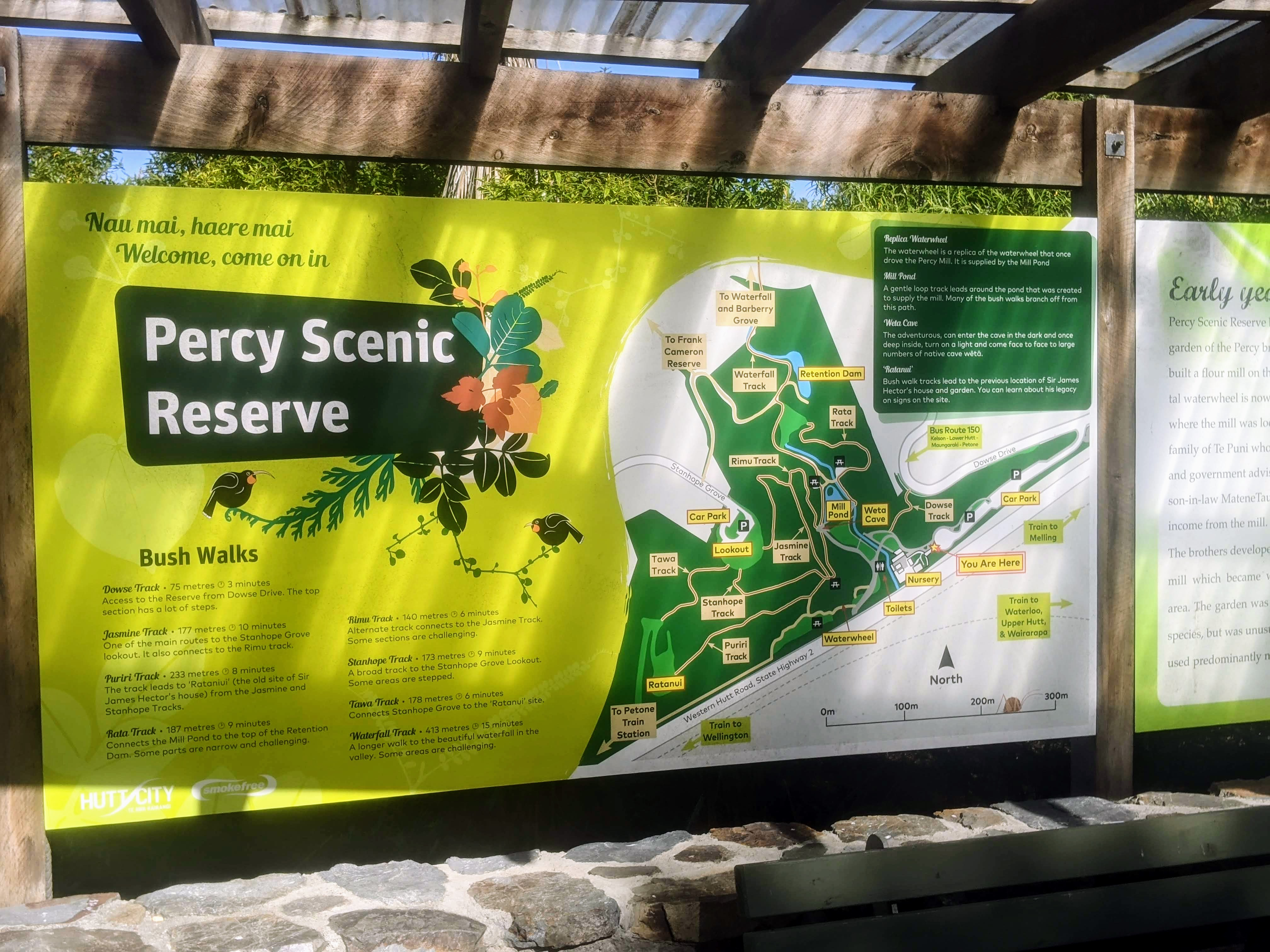
Tracks at Percy Scenic Reserve

- Dowse Track – 3 minutes, 75 m (246 ft)
- Jasmine Track – 10 minutes, 177 m (581 ft)
- Puriri Track – 8 minutes, 233 m (764 ft)
- Rātā Track – 9 minutes, 187 m (614 ft)
- Rīmu Track – 6 minutes, 140 m (460 ft)
- Stanhope Track – 9 minutes, 173 m (568 ft)
- Tawa Track - 6 minutes, 178 m (584 ft)
- Waterfall Track – 15 minutes, 413 m (1,355 ft)

== Forest reserve ==
The forest at Percy Scenic Reserve covers around 16.93 hectares (41.8 acres) of the catchment area of the Percy Stream, and includes some original podocarp broadleaf forest, large non-native trees, and regenerating forest and scrub.

=== Fauna ===
Native birds seen (and/or heard) at Percy Scenic Reserve include kererū, tūī, and New Zealand fantail (piwakawaka). There are also yellowhammer and mallards

Cave wētā and common skinks are also present.

== Ex-Situ Plant conservation ==
The ex-situ conservation collection is housed in a series of purpose-built houses which are designed to match their native habitats as closely as possible.

== See also ==
- Sir James Hector
- Hōniana Te Puni-kōkopu
- New Zealand Plant Conservation Network
- Ōtari-Wilton's Bush
