= Hay Scenic Reserve =

Conservation reserve on Banks Peninsula, New Zealand

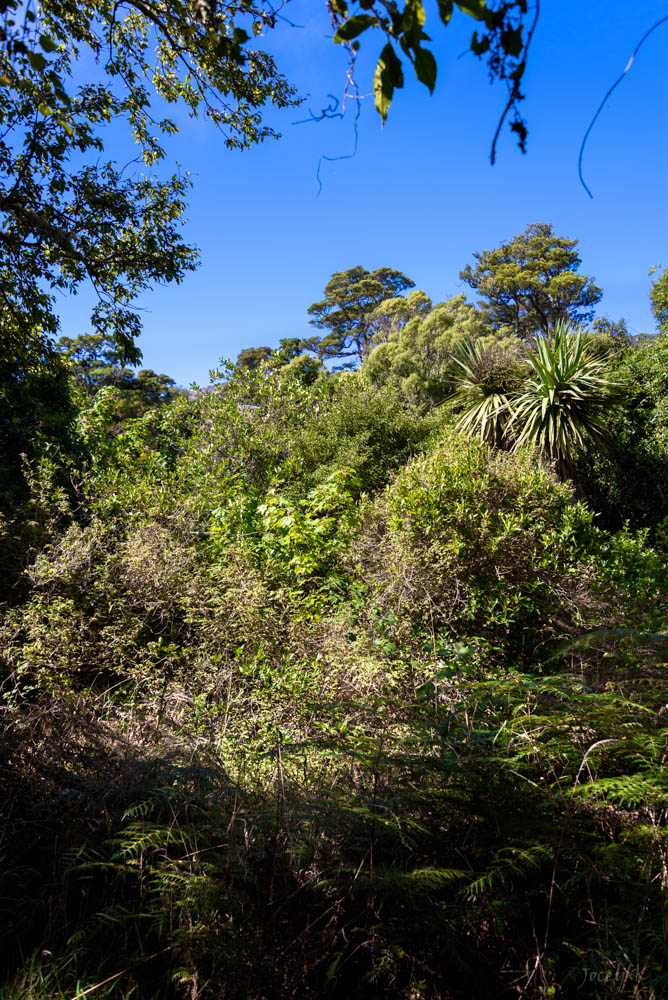

- Location within Banks Peninsula
- Location: Pigeon Bay
- Nearest city: Christchurch
- Coordinates: 43°42′14″S 172°53′53″E
- Area: 6 hectares (15 acres)
- Elevation: 182 m (597.11 ft)
- Created: 1973
- Etymology: After the Hay family
- Operator: Department of Conservation (New Zealand)

Hay Scenic Reserve is a public conservation reserve in Pigeon Bay, Banks Peninsula, south-east of Christchurch, New Zealand. It was preserved from logging by the Hay family for 100 years, and is notably one of the only sites on the Peninsula where miro (Prumnopitys ferruginea) can be found – a single tree survives in the reserve.

== Geography ==
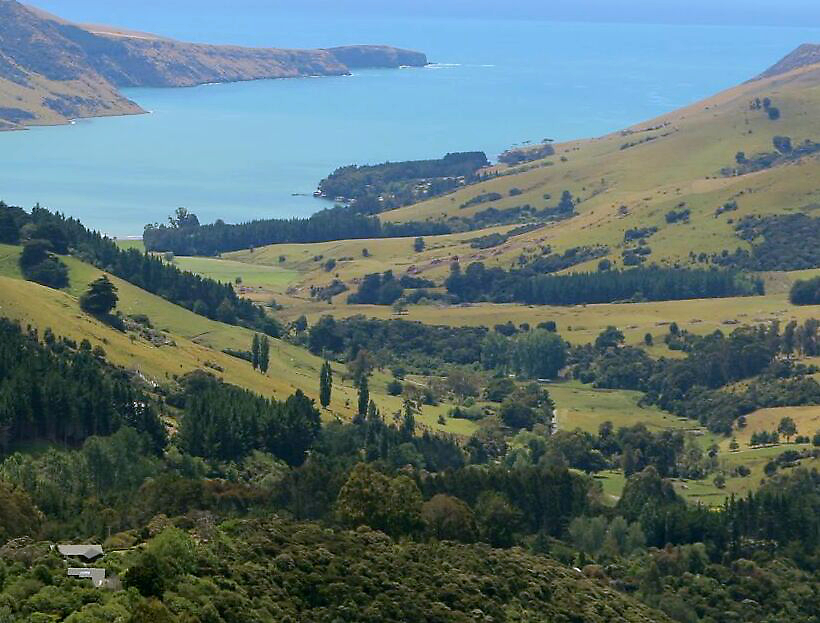
Hay Scenic Reserve, the central forest remnant surrounded by farmland

Hay Scenic Reserve is located in Pigeon Bay, about 30 kilometres (19 mi) southeast of Christchurch. The reserve is only 6 hectares (15 acres) in size, 2 kilometres (1.2 mi) up the valley and from the shore. The Reserve is on the eastern side of Pigeon Bay Road at the corner of Wilsons (or Cemetery) Road, and Pigeon Bay Stream passes through it. It is reached via Akaroa Highway and the Summit Road turnoff at Hilltop, 5 km from the Summit Road turnoff to Pigeon Bay. An easy 30-minute loop track passes through most of the forest and crosses the stream.

== History ==
The reserve is named after Pigeon Bay's pioneer family, the first of whom were Ebenezer and Eliza Hay who arrived in the bay in 1843. It was gifted to the New Zealand Government by their descendant James Browning Hay in August 1971, along with a less-accessible forest remnant on Mount Sinclair that became Glenrallock Reserve. Both were officially gazetted as scenic reserves in September 1973.

== Ecology ==
=== Flora ===
Hay Scenic Reserve is one of the most significant remaining stands of lowland podocarp/broadleaf forest on Banks Peninsula. Large forest trees include kahikatea, tōtara, and mataī. Exotic trees are planted around the reserve edges, and sometimes inside the boundary. Hugh Wilson has estimated the age of kahikatea trees at 300–400 years, some mataī over 400 years, and the largest tōtara up to 1000 years. Wilson estimated the reserve as among the best four or five remnants in the region, comparable only to the forest in Kaituna Valley and Prices Valley.

A centrepiece of the reserve is a surviving miro (Prumnopitys ferruginea) tree. Miro are almost completely absent from Banks Peninsula – this tree and several others in Port Levy are the only ones known. James Hay writing in 1915 notes "There were at one time only three Miro trees in Pigeon Bay, and one of them still survives. In Port Levy there were more than in all the rest of the Peninsula."

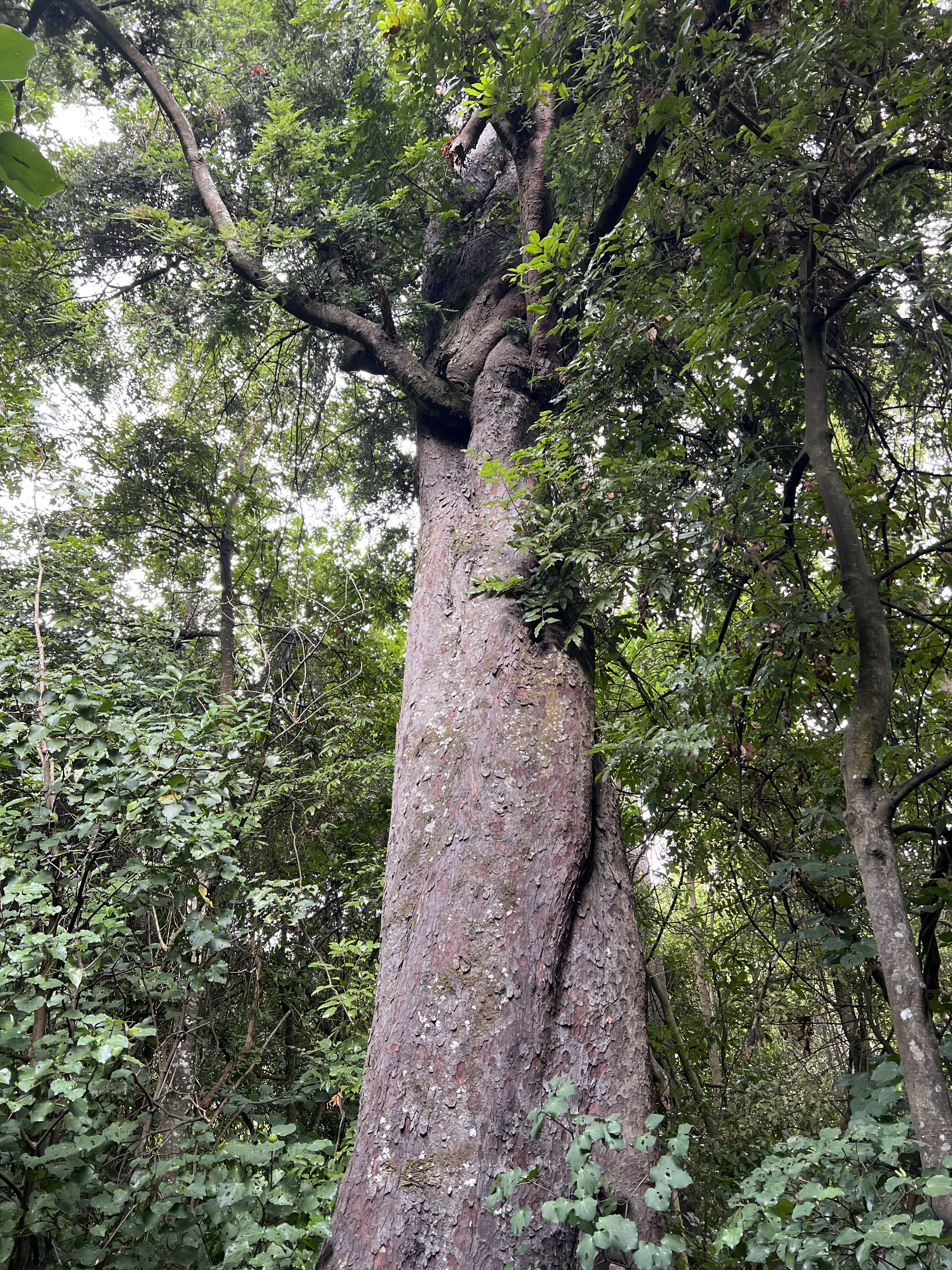
The sole remaining miro tree in the Reserve

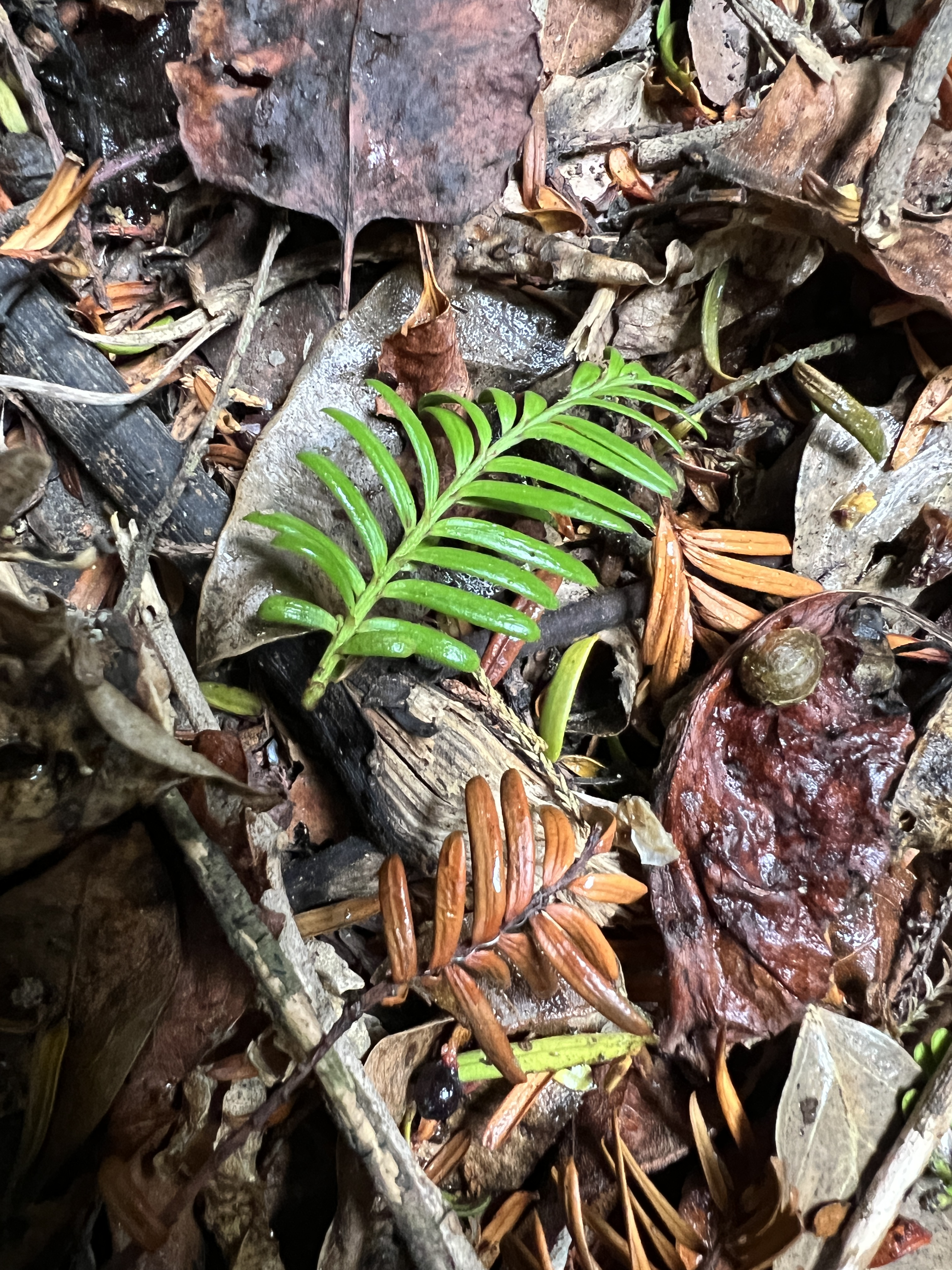
Miro leaves on the forest floor

== Management ==
Although they cleared the valley's bush for pasture, the Hay family refused to fell this forest remnant for over a century, despite potentially-lucrative offers from Banks Peninsula's active timber mills in the late 19th century. The reserve is now managed by the Department of Conservation.

== See also ==
- Conservation in New Zealand
- Banks Peninsula
