= Korokoro, New Zealand =

Suburb of Lower Hutt, New Zealand

Korokoro
- Suburb
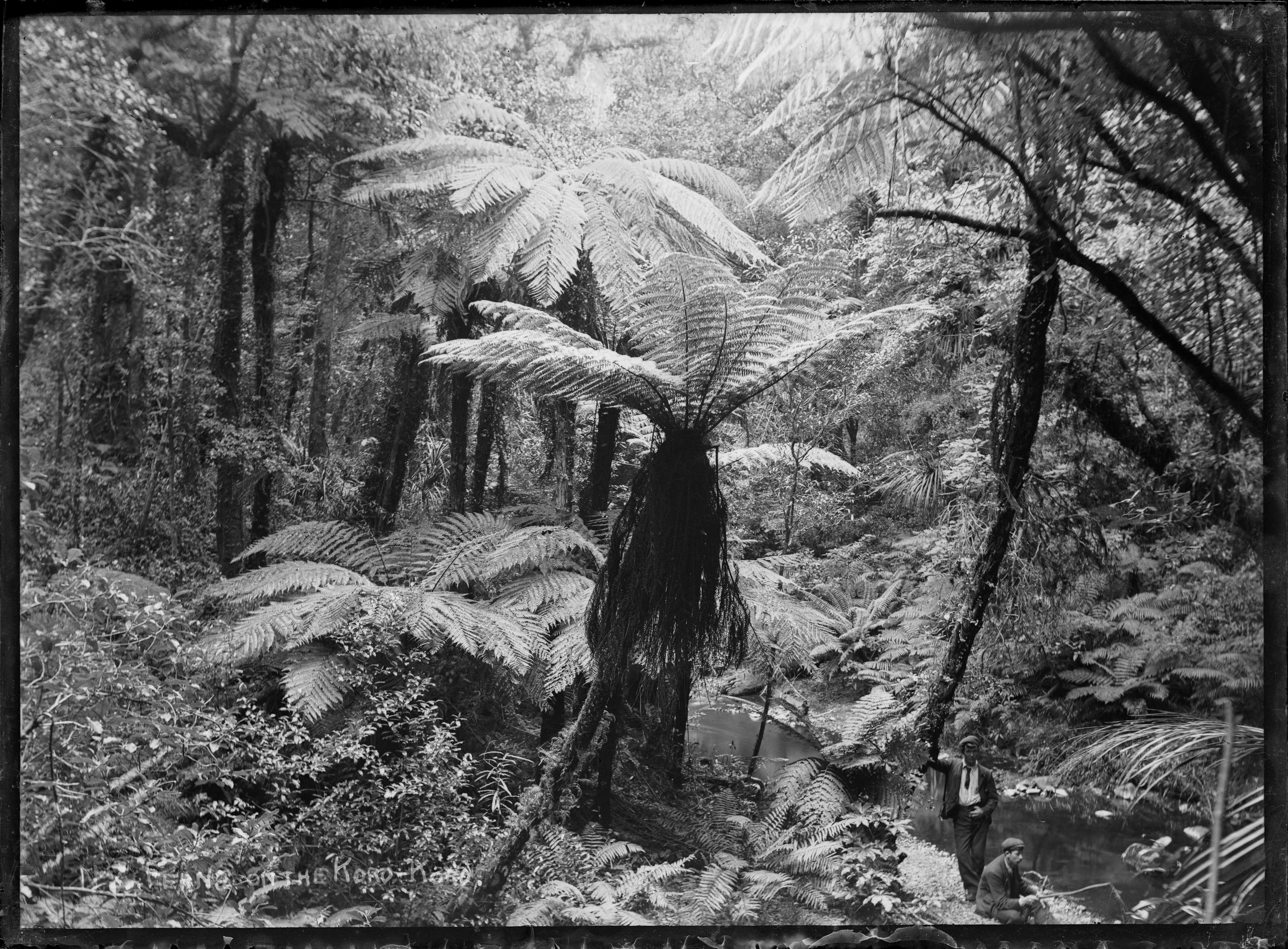
- Native bush with tree ferns, a stream, and two men in right foreground, at Korokoro
- Interactive map of Korokoro
- Coordinates: 41.215°S 174.869°E
- Country: New Zealand
- City: Lower Hutt
- Local authority: Hutt City Council
- Electoral ward: Harbour
- Established: 1900s

Area
  - Land: 185 ha (460 acres)

Population (June 2025)
  - Total: 1,590
  - Density: 859/km^{2} (2,230/sq mi)

		Maungaraki
	Korokoro	Alicetown, Ava
Horokiwi		Petone

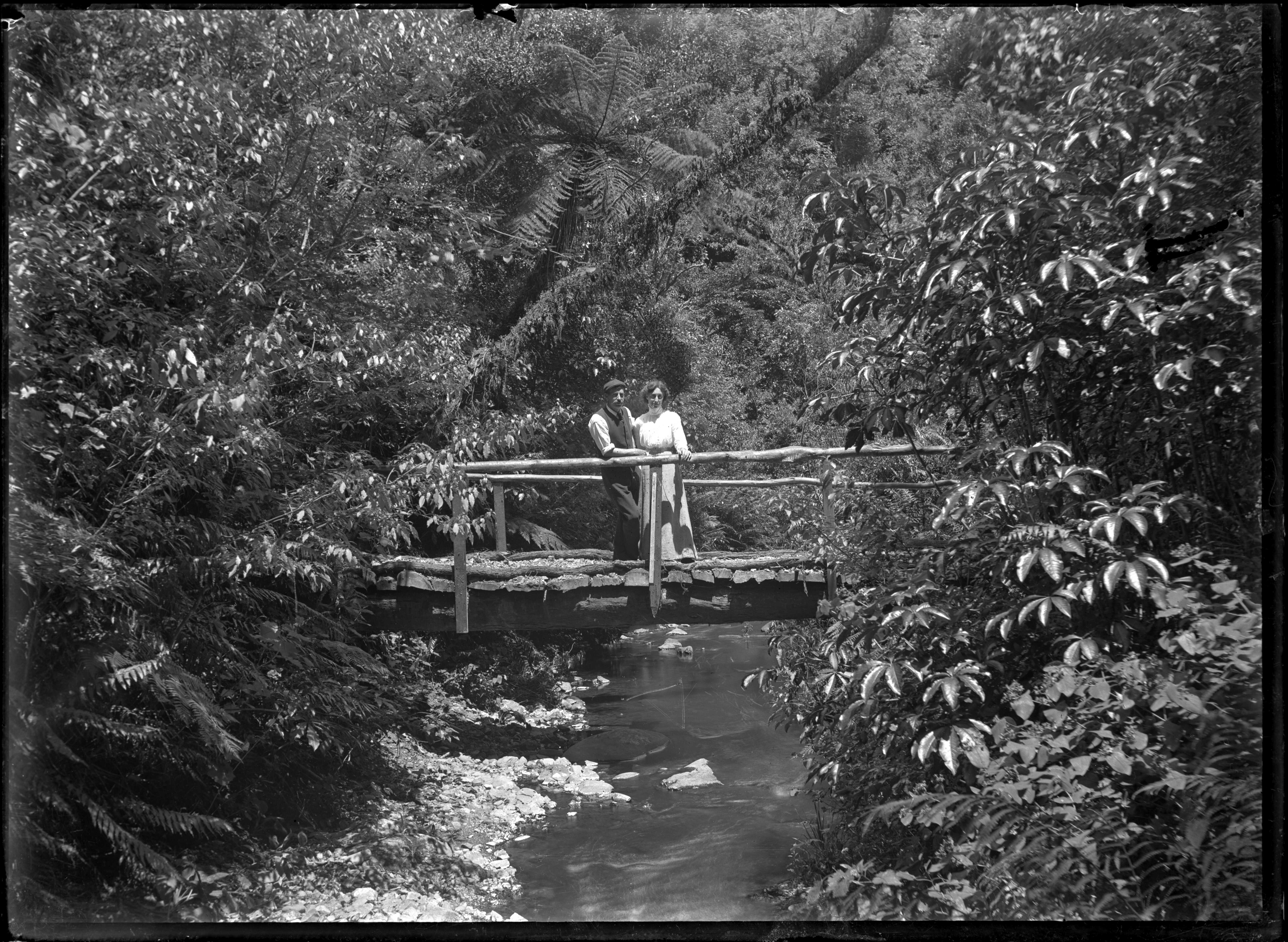
Keen walkers on a stream crossing

Korokoro, a suburb of Lower Hutt City, lies in the south of the North Island of New Zealand. The suburb occupies part of the western hills of the Hutt Valley; its eastern slopes overlook Petone and the Wellington harbour.

Korokoro was established in the 1900s by the Liberal government (in office 1891–1912), and remained a relatively small settlement until the Lower Hutt City Council developed the area for private housing in the 1960s. Before 1989, Korokoro formed part of the Petone Borough, which amalgamated with Lower Hutt City in that year.

== Demographics ==
Korokoro statistical area covers 1.85 km^{2} (0.71 sq mi). It had an estimated population of 1,590 as of June 2025, with a population density of 859 people per km^{2}.

Historical population
Year	Pop.	±% p.a.
2006	1,284	—
2013	1,329	+0.49%
2018	1,482	+2.20%
2023	1,515	+0.44%

Korokoro had a population of 1,515 in the 2023 New Zealand census, an increase of 33 people (2.2%) since the 2018 census, and an increase of 186 people (14.0%) since the 2013 census. There were 753 males, 759 females, and 3 people of other genders in 543 dwellings. 4.4% of people identified as LGBTIQ+. The median age was 39.0 years (compared with 38.1 years nationally). There were 330 people (21.8%) aged under 15 years, 216 (14.3%) aged 15 to 29, 795 (52.5%) aged 30 to 64, and 174 (11.5%) aged 65 or older.

People could identify as more than one ethnicity. The results were 86.1% European (Pākehā); 10.9% Māori; 3.4% Pasifika; 10.3% Asian; 2.4% Middle Eastern, Latin American and African New Zealanders (MELAA); and 1.6% other, which includes people giving their ethnicity as "New Zealander". English was spoken by 96.8%, Māori by 2.4%, Samoan by 0.6%, and other languages by 15.0%. No language could be spoken by 2.4% (e.g. too young to talk). New Zealand Sign Language was known by 0.8%. The percentage of people born overseas was 24.6, compared with 28.8% nationally.

Religious affiliations were 26.5% Christian, 1.6% Hindu, 0.2% Islam, 0.6% Māori religious beliefs, 1.6% Buddhist, 0.6% New Age, 0.2% Jewish, and 1.4% other religions. People who answered that they had no religion were 62.8%, and 5.1% of people did not answer the census question.

Of those at least 15 years old, 501 (42.3%) people had a bachelor's or higher degree, 546 (46.1%) had a post-high school certificate or diploma, and 141 (11.9%) people exclusively held high school qualifications. The median income was $64,000, compared with $41,500 nationally. 324 people (27.3%) earned over $100,000 compared to 12.1% nationally. The employment status of those at least 15 was 738 (62.3%) full-time, 186 (15.7%) part-time, and 18 (1.5%) unemployed.

== Education ==
Korokoro School is a co-educational state primary school for Year 1 to 8 students, with a roll of 215 as of October 2025. The school opened in 1904.
