= Tokatoka Scenic Reserve =

Scenic reserve in New Zealand

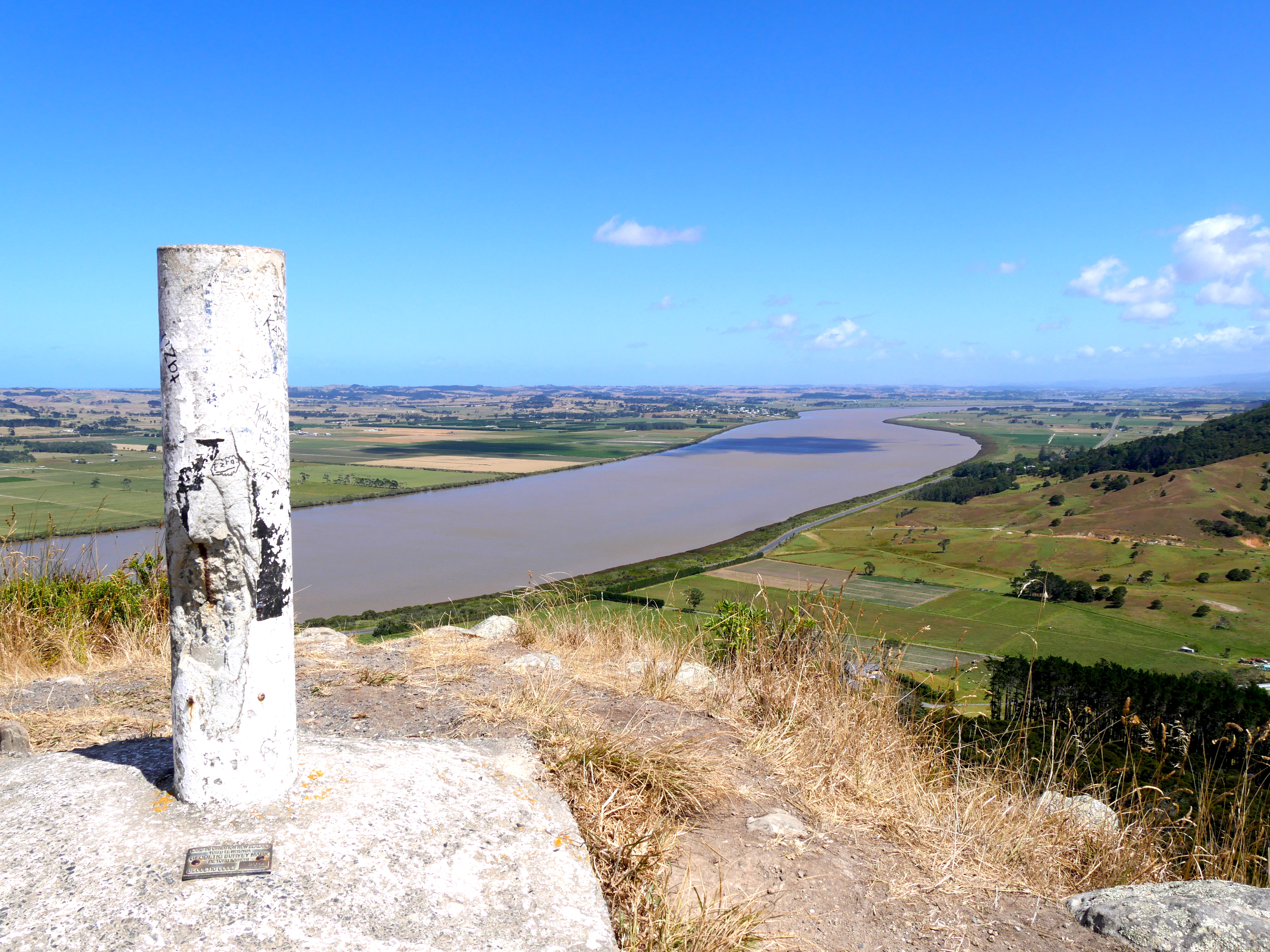
- View from Tokatoka Peak looking northwest along the Wairoa River towards Dargaville.

- Location within Northland Region
- Location: Tokatoka, Northland Region, New Zealand
- Nearest city: Dargaville
- Coordinates: 36°03′26.3″S 173°58′29.8″E
- Max. elevation: 180 metres (590 ft)

The Tokatoka Scenic Reserve (also known as Tokatoka Lookout or Tokatoka Peak) is a reserve in the Northland Region in the North Island of New Zealand. It is located near the Wairoa River, about 16 kilometres (9.9 mi) southeast of Dargaville.

The reserve's most prominent feature is a distinctive 180 metres (590 ft) high peak.

== History ==
According to Māori mythology, a group of small mountains traveled from Hawaiki in search of a new home. The largest, Manaia, moved ahead of the others and eventually settled at the head of Whangarei Harbour. The remaining mountains hesitated to cross the Wairoa River, and one was lost in the attempt. As a result, mountains such as Maungaraho and Tokatoka stayed in their current locations, where they remain today.

In the 1800s, when the nearby Kaipara was a busy shipping harbour, a river pilot lived at the base of Tokatoka and climbed the peak to watch for ships entering the harbour.

== Geology ==
Tokatoka Peak is the eroded remnant of the plug of an extinct andesite volcano. It was formed when lava solidified in the pipe of an extinct volcano. The cone has worn away, leaving the plug behind.

== Etymology ==
In Māori, toka is either a rock or the verb to be solid or firm. Reduplication is a common feature in the Māori language with tokatoka meaning to be rock hard or rocky.
