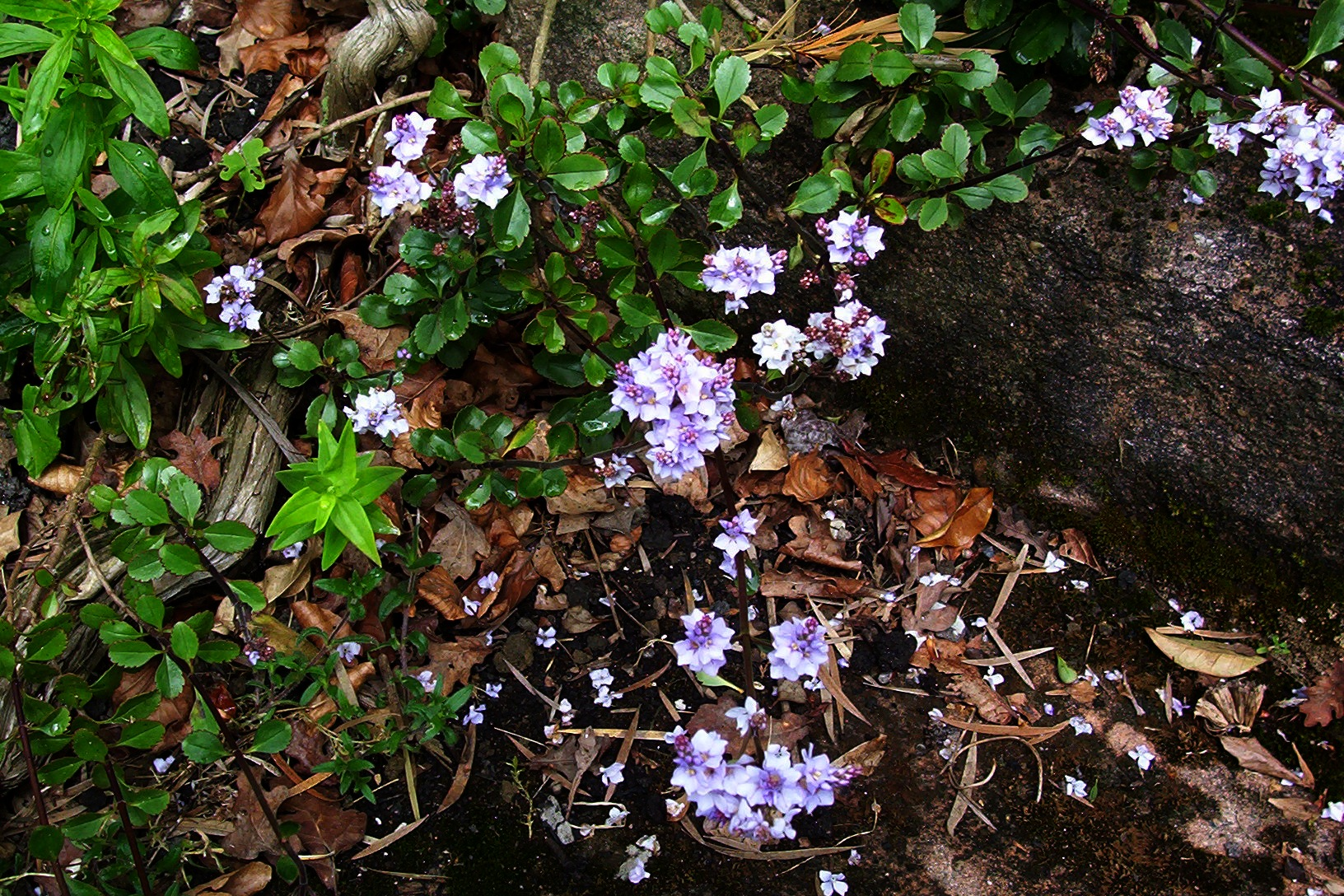

Scientific classification
- Kingdom: Plantae
- Clade: Tracheophytes
- Clade: Angiosperms
- Clade: Eudicots
- Clade: Asterids
- Order: Lamiales
- Family: Plantaginaceae
- Genus: Veronica
- Section: Veronica sect. Hebe
- Species: V. hulkeana

Binomial name
- Veronica hulkeana F.Muell. ex Hook.f.

Synonyms
- Hebe hulkeana (F.Muell. ex Hook.f.) Andersen; Heliohebe hulkeana (F.Muell. ex Hook.f.) Garn.-Jones; Parahebe hulkeana (F.Muell. ex Hook.f.) Heads

= Veronica hulkeana =

Species of flowering plant

Veronica hulkeana, synonym Hebe hulkeana, the New Zealand lilac, is a species of plant in the Plantaginaceae. Its pale mauve flowers are on long sprays, which develop from the tips of the branches. The dainty flowers, which occur in profusion, last from October until December. The foliage is dark green and shiny. The leaves are elliptic to obtuse in shape and are 7–10 cm long and 2–3 cm wide. This cold-hardy plant is easy to grow, providing it has well drained, light soil and an open, sunny position. Its natural habitat is in dry rocky places in the northern part of the South Island up to an altitude of 900 m.
