= Scenery Preservation Act 1903 =

Act of Parliament in New Zealand

Scenery Preservation Act

New Zealand Parliament

Legislative history
- Passed: 1903

Related legislation
- Reserves and Domains Act 1953
- Status: Repealed

The Scenery Preservation Act was an Act of Parliament passed in 1903 in New Zealand.

The act provided up to £25,000 a year for compulsory purchase of land of scenic or historic interest, under the Public Works Act 1894. It was introduced by Joseph Ward, Minister of Tourism and Publicity in the Liberal government, following campaigning by Leonard Cockayne and Harry Ell. The act was amended in 1906, 1908, 1910 and 1926 and replaced by the Reserves and Domains Act 1953.

== Background ==
At the second reading of the Scenery Preservation Bill on 22 October 1903, Premier Richard Seddon described the benefits of the proposed Act: it would stop the destruction of beauty spots caused by deforestation and development, safeguard threatened flora and fauna and preserve important historic sites including Māori sites. Seddon noted that foreign visitors often valued New Zealand's scenery more than New Zealanders did. The proposed Act would also promote the fledgling tourism industry. Some reserves had already been created around the country, and New Zealand's first national parks had already been established at Tongariro (1887) and Taranaki (1900). Various scientific and horticultural groups had also been campaigning for years for the protection of scenery and special habitats.

The bill provided for a commission to investigate potential sites that would be compulsorily acquired and preserved by the government. The commission was to be allocated £100,000 over four years for its work. The bill was widely supported, though some parliamentarians questioned the need for a commission. Some reasoned that each member of parliament would know their own area well and could suggest areas for preservation directly to the government. The Scenery Preservation Act passed on 20 November 1903. It laid out the appointment of a commission, funding and costs and rules for acquiring land to be preserved.

== Scenery Preservation Commission ==
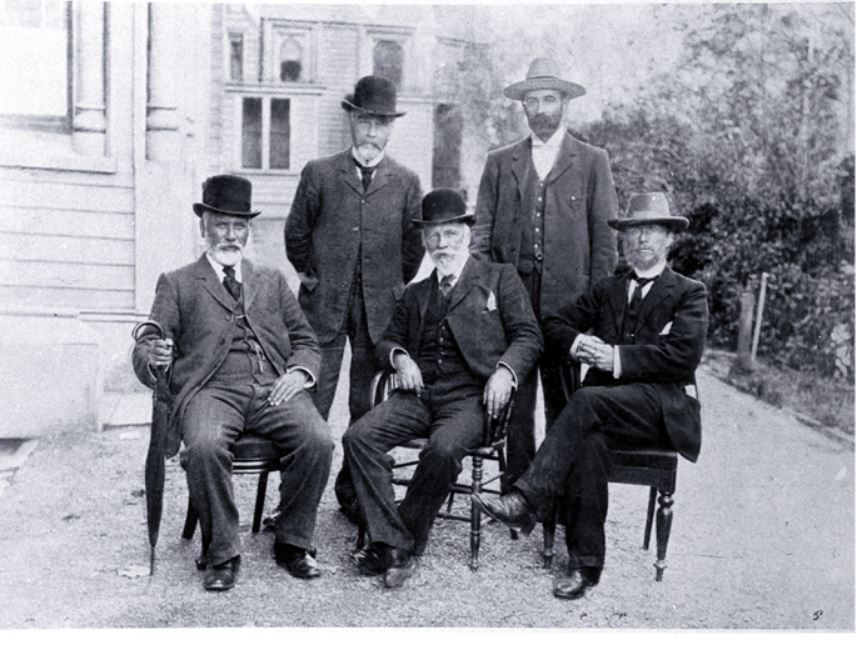
The Scenery Preservation Commission. Left to right: H. Tunuiarangi, W.J. Marchant, S. Percy Smith, H.J. Matthews, W.W. Smith

The Scenery Preservation Commission was appointed in March 1904 following the passing of the act. Its objective was to inspect places considered to possess scenic interest and to recommend land to be acquired and preserved by the government for its scenic, thermal or historic value. Land would be acquired regardless of its current ownership by the Crown, Māori or private owners. The Commission was managed by the Department of Tourist and Health Resorts and at first operated from Wellington. In 1905 the commission visited 74 localities all over New Zealand, meeting in seven different locations. The Commission had five members:

- Stephenson Percy Smith (chairman of the Commission), a former Surveyor-General with wide knowledge of New Zealand's landscapes.
- Henry Matthews, Chief Government Forester
- John Marchant, succeeded Percy Smith as Surveyor-General; Crown Lands Commissioner
- William Smith, horticulturalist and amateur naturalist and conservationist with extensive knowledge of birds and their habitats.
- Major Hoani Tunuiarangi, a Māori leader and member of the Maori Parliament (Kotahitanga). He could provide advice about pā and old Māori battle sites.

Possible sites for designation as scenic reserves were suggested by Members of Parliament wanting to promote their own areas, and Joseph Ward suggested 18 sites from all over New Zealand. There was a focus on selecting sites accessible by road or rail and along navigable rivers, since these locations would encourage tourists to visit.

The commission made 383 recommendations during the two years it operated. Only 61 reserves were created, totalling 15 000 acres (6075 ha). Most of these were small sites, often covered in bush, on land that was unsuitable for settlement. Wilton's Bush in Wellington and the Waitomo Glowworm Cave were two of the sites preserved under the act.

In June 1906 the Scenery Preservation Commission was disbanded and in October 1906 an amendment to the 1903 Act was created. The amendment provided that the work of the Commission would now be undertaken by a board consisting of the Surveyor General, the General Manager of the Tourist and Health Resorts Department, and the Commissioner of Crown Lands in any district where a site was under consideration for preservation. A secretary and inspectors might assist the board.

== See also ==
- Environment of New Zealand
- Conservation in New Zealand
