= Excitor =

Fast boat tourist experience

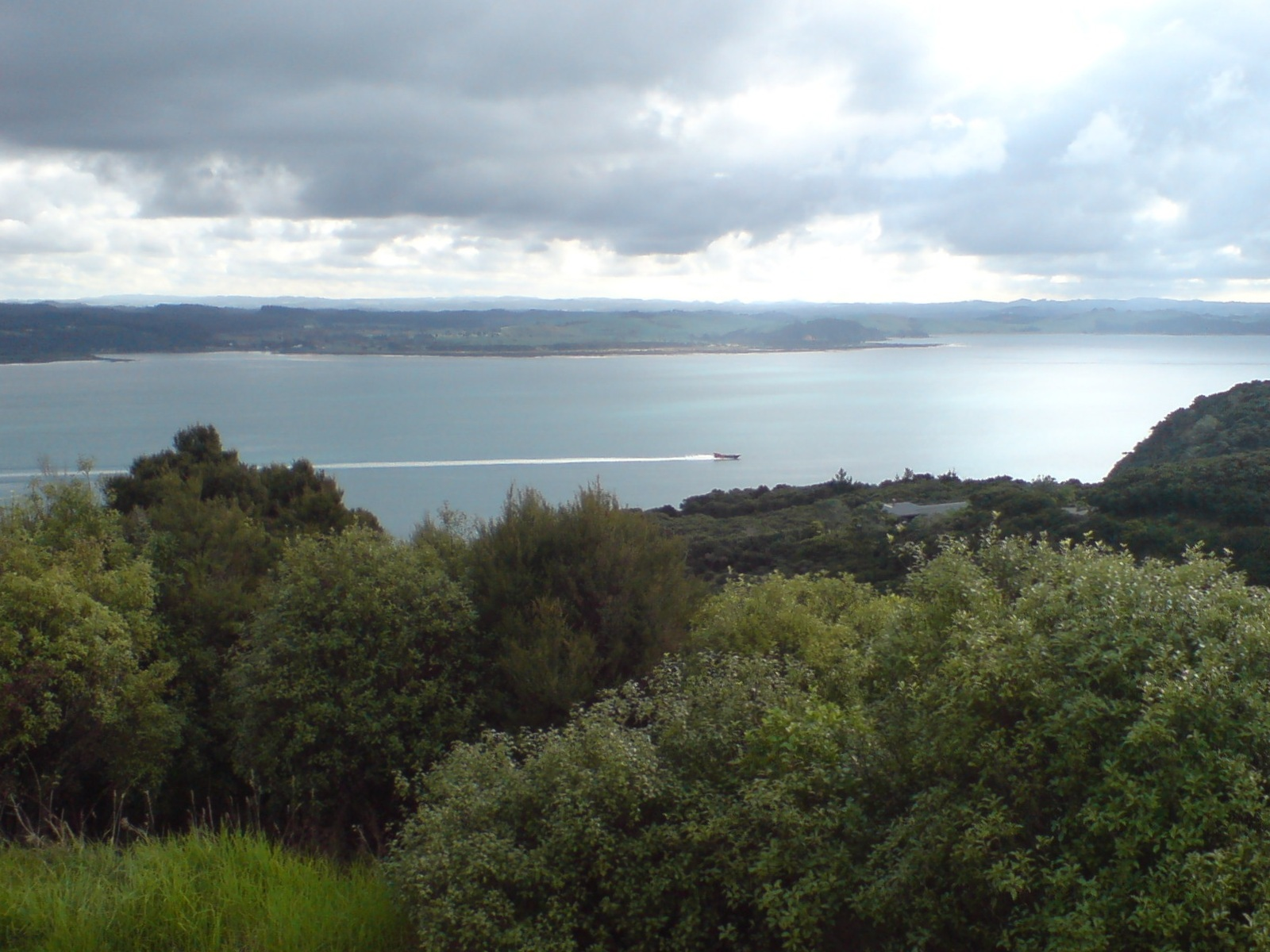
The Excitor outbound to the 'Hole in the Rock'

The Excitor was a fast boat tourist experience in the Bay of Islands, New Zealand, that operated until 2011. It was used on a high-speed trip through the scenic bay out to Cape Brett, where the boat travelled through the 'Hole in the Rock', a natural sea-tunnel (wave-heights permitting). The boat was operated by Tourism Holdings Ltd, then by InterCity.

Passengers sitting in the open boat had to wear lifejackets, and waves swamping the boat had been reported, though it was designed to quickly drain the water through its stern.

== Vessels ==
Three vessels were used over the years to operate the Excitor experience.

=== Excitor I ===
Excitor I was in use by for six years on around 900 trips. It was involved in a serious incident in 1998, when a mechanical failure in the gearbox linkage caused the boat to become unsteerable while entering Cathedral Cave. With the starboard engine still running ahead, the bow of the vessel collided with the cave wall. Twenty-nine people aboard had to abandon the boat and were forced to "swim for their lives" to the mouth of the cave, while the boat was battered against the cave roof by 3 m high wave swells. After 20 minutes, the operator was able to reverse the boat out of the cave, radio for help, and pick up the passengers. One person sustained light injuries, and one young child suffered hypothermia.

Passengers involved in the incident accused the operator of subsequently downplaying the duration and the risks during the incident, such as the danger of being dashed against rocks. They were also critical of the (at that time unreleased) official incident report by the Maritime Safety Authority, which was said to have failed to address contributing factors such as the late arrival (5 pm) of the boat at the cave, the height of the swells outside the cave mouth, as well as alleged fatigue of the skipper.

=== Excitor II ===
Around the end of 2002, the larger Excitor II was introduced. The timber-fiberglass jetboat was built by Johnson Yachts International, and used 2 x 'Seafury' jetboat drives built in Silverdale, Auckland, powered by 2 x 800 hp turbo intercooled Caterpillar engines. It reached speeds of up to 46 knots (approximately 85 km/h), and carried 46-54 tourists. It was 18 m long, 4.2 m wide and had a 1.2 m draft.

=== Excitor III ===
In October 2010 a faster Excitor III was introduced. The 12.5m Naiad rigid hull inflatable vessel carried up to 35 passengers at up to 50 knots, powered by 4 x 300 hp V8 engines. Built by Whangārei-based Circa Marine, and specifically designed for conditions in the Bay of Islands, the new Excitor featured straddle seats, an ultra modern low wake hull design and a retractable set of stairs built into the bow to allow her to service any beach in the Bay of Islands. In January and March 2011, passengers were injured in incidents on the boat and Maritime New Zealand stopped the boat operating.
