= Te Ao Island =

Small island in New Zealand

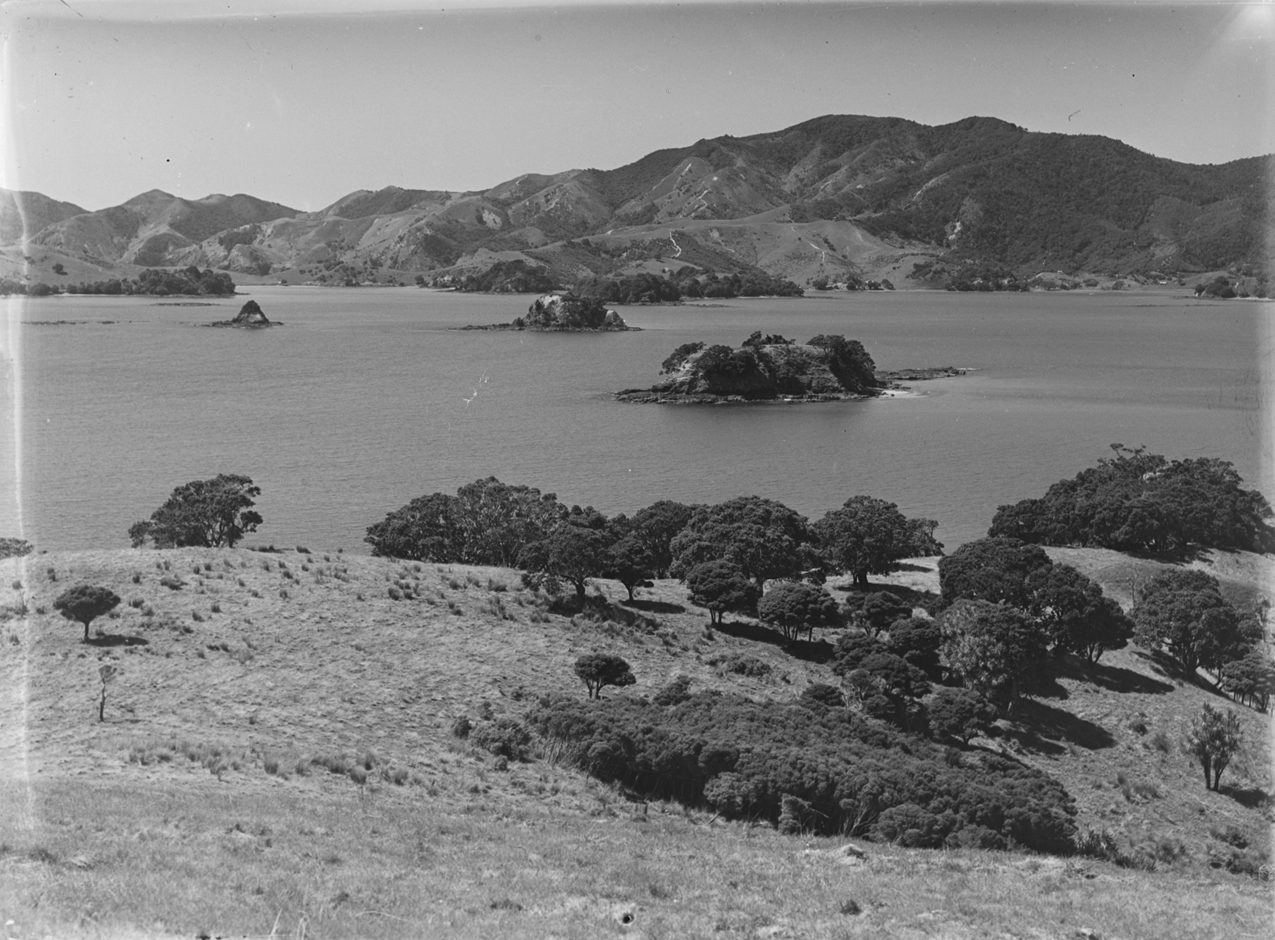
- Te Ao (nearest island) viewed from Urupukapuka

- Location within Northland Region

Geography
- Location: Bay of Islands
- Coordinates: \35°13′38.7″S 174°14′28.6″E

Administration
- New Zealand

Te Ao Island, location within the Bay Of Islands, Northland Region, New Zealand
Te Ao Island, Bay Of Islands, Northland NZ

Te Ao Island is a small island in the Bay of Islands of New Zealand, located about 11 kilometres (6.8 mi) northeast of Russell. It sits in the Albert Channel directly between Round Island and Mahenotiti Island and is about 380 metres (1,250 ft) from Urupukapuka Island.
