= Motutara Island (Bay of Islands) =

Small island in New Zealand

- Location within Northland Region

Geography
- Location: Bay of Islands
- Coordinates: 35°12′51.9″S 174°11′42.3″E

Administration
- New Zealand

Motutara Island, location within the Bay Of Islands, Northland Region, New Zealand
Motutara Island, Bay Of Islands, Northland NZ

Motutara Island is a small island in the Bay of Islands of New Zealand, located about 8.33 kilometres (5.18 mi) northeast of Russell.

Motutara Island is situated between the northern ends of Motukiekie Island and Moturua Island.

Motutara Island shares a name with Motutara Rock (Twins Rock) which lies about 10 kilometres (6.2 mi) further to the northeast.

== Etymology ==
In Māori, 'motu' means island and 'tara' is a peak or point.
