= Moturoa Island (Bay of Islands) =

Small island, New Zealand

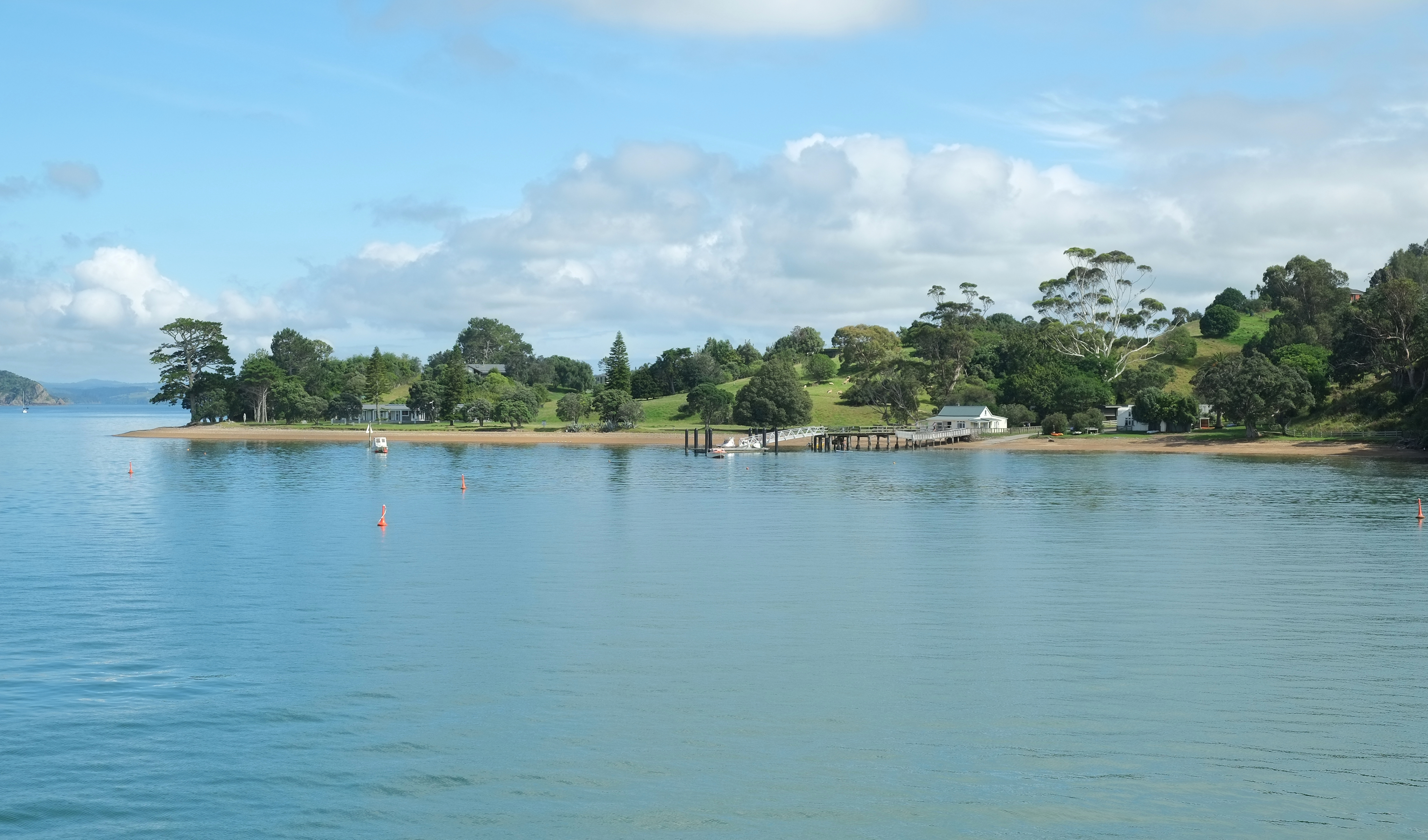
- Western tip of Moturoa Island, Kent Passage to the left

- Location within Northland Region

Geography
- Location: Bay of Islands
- Coordinates: 35°12′37″S 174°05′22″E
- Area: 1.57 km^{2} (0.61 sq mi)
- Length: 2.95 km (1.833 mi)
- Highest elevation: 82 m (269 ft)

Administration
- New Zealand

Moturoa Island, location within the Bay of Islands, Northland Region, New Zealand
Moturoa Island, Bay of Islands, Northland NZ

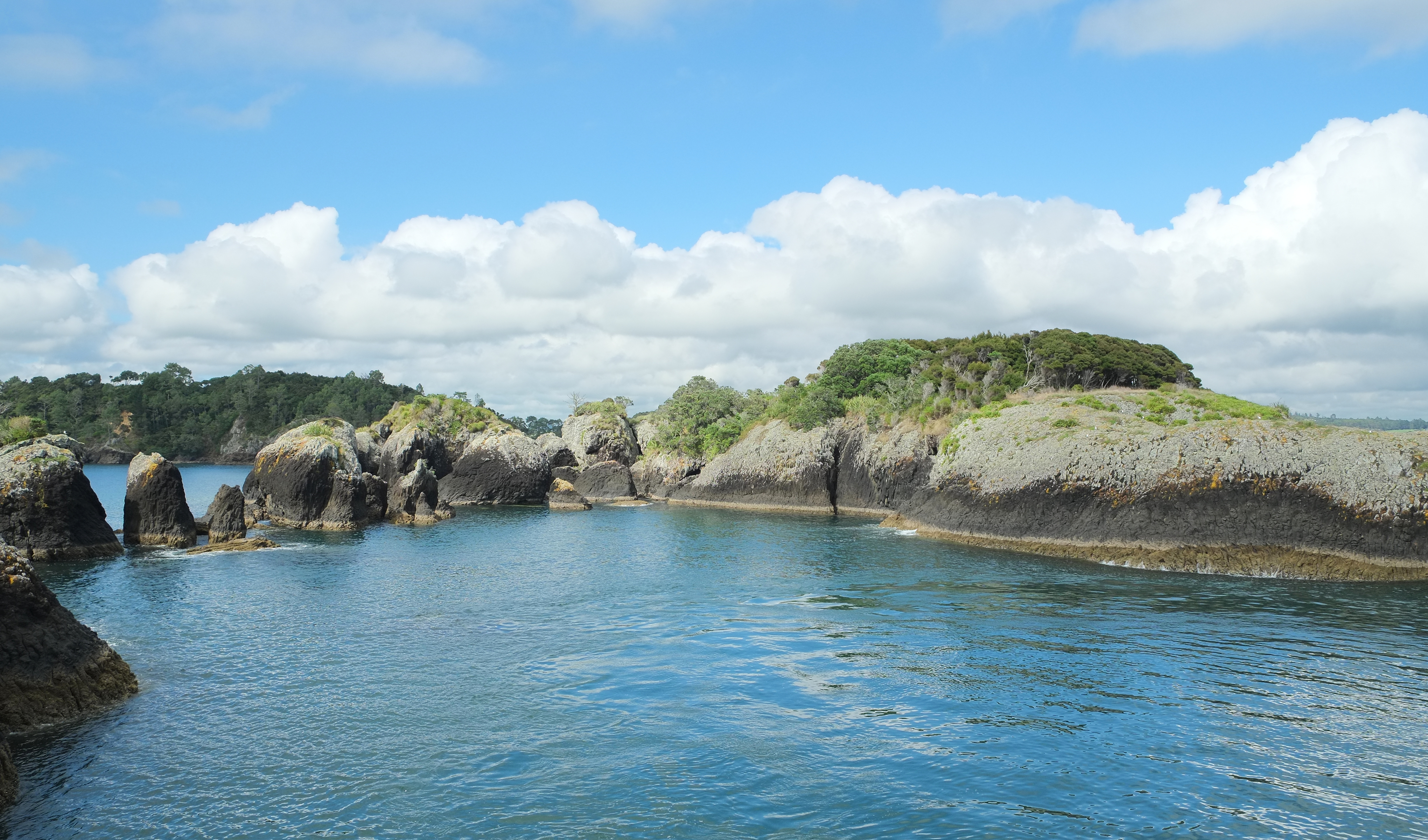
Rocks north of Moturoa Island

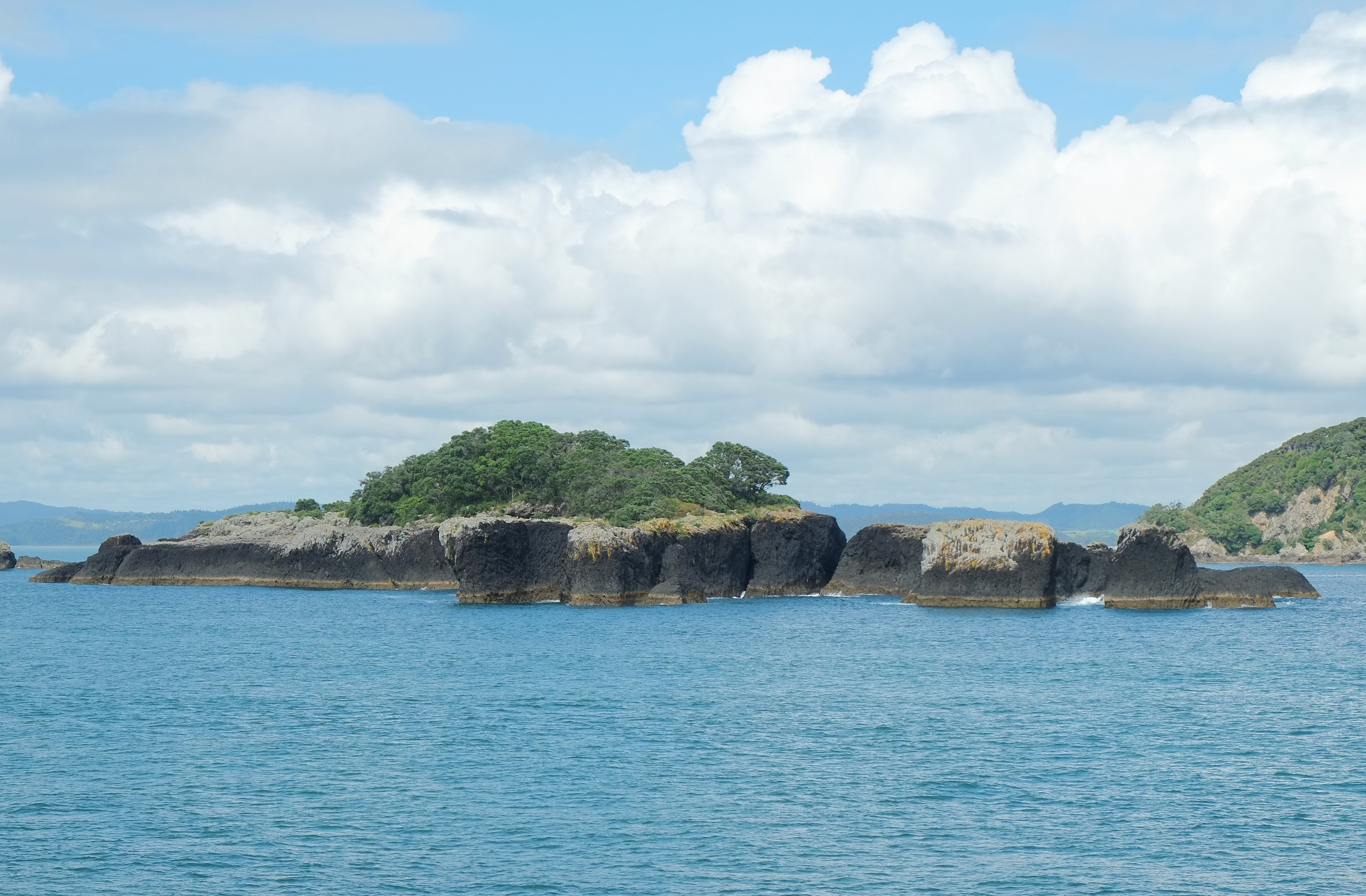
Battleship Rock off Moturoa Island

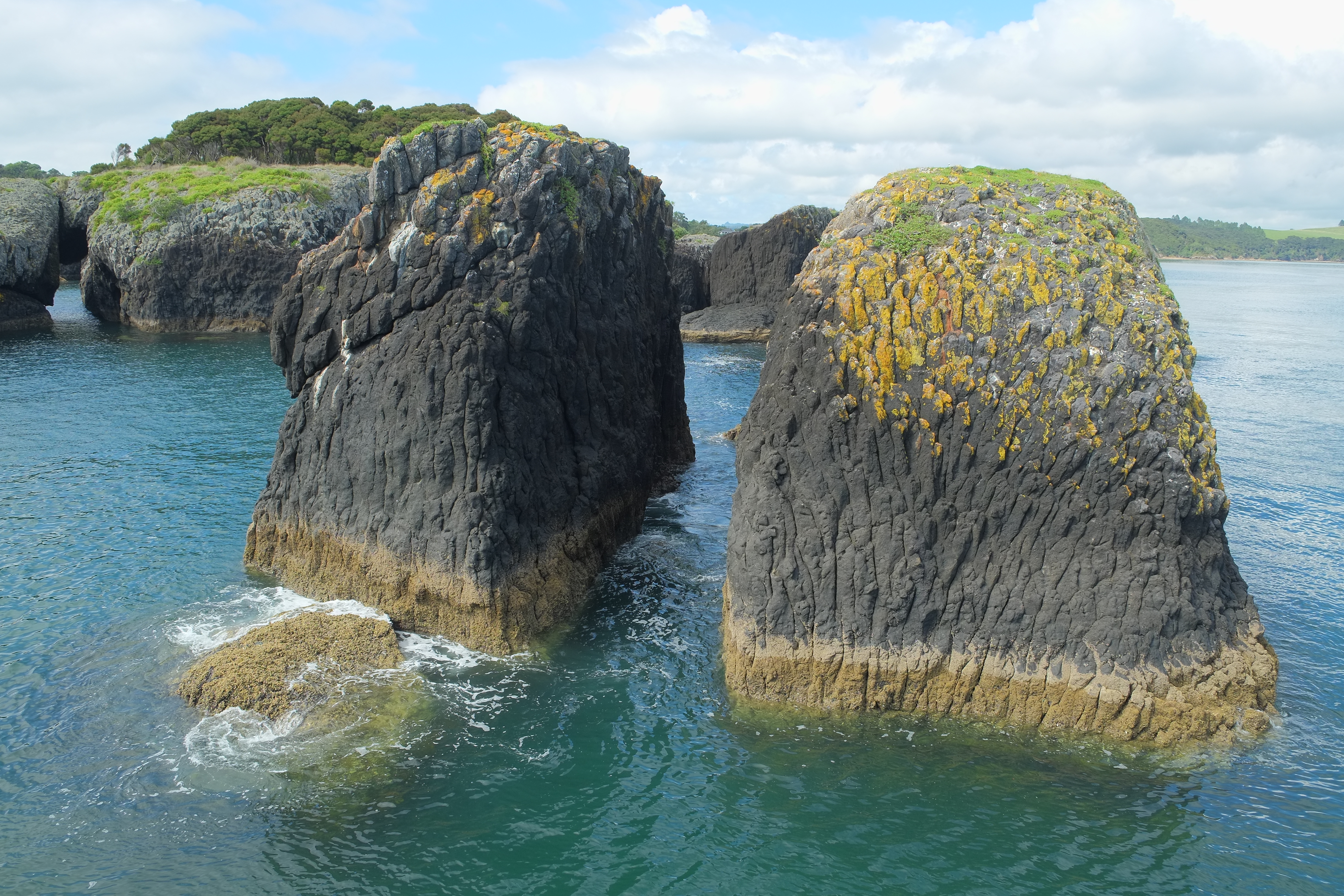
Rock stacks north of Moturoa Island

Moturoa Island is a small island in the Bay of Islands of New Zealand, located about 7 kilometres (4.3 mi) northwest of Russell. It is about 360 metres (1,180 ft) from the mainland, separated by the Kent Passage. The nearest point is known as Day Point.

Moturoa is adjacent to Black Rocks and Battleship Rock.

There are approximately 20 house and 6 farm buildings on the island, all situated on the western side. Moturoa is owned by 21 families but only has a few permanent residents. About one third of the island has been fenced to create a designated area for wildlife.

== Conservation efforts ==
Although the island is privately owned, it is gazetted as a Wildlife Refuge. The island was one of the first private ecosystem restoration projects in New Zealand.

Since the early 1980s, efforts have been made to restore the island to its former state. Stock fences were installed to protect the bush, flax (Phormium tenax) and kauri (Agathis australis) were planted and pest controls were implemented. Five small wetlands and ponds were created. More than 65,000 native trees and shrubs have been planted since 1980 and invasive plants such as gorse (Ulex europaeus), woolly nightshade (Solanum mauritianum), moth plant (Araujia hortorum), and pampas grass (Coraderia selloana) have been removed.

Native plants on the island now include kānuka (Kunzea robusta), mapou (Myrsine australis) and some pōhutukawa (Metrosideros excelsa).

=== Bird life ===
Moturoa Island is home to a number of birds with eighty bird species recorded on or within about 3 kilometres (1.9 mi) of the island.

Nine bird species that were historically present on the islands have been successfully reintroduced. These include:

- Pāteke (brown teal, Anas chlorotis) (introduced 1983 and later)
- Toutouwai (North Island robin, Petroica longipes) (introduced 1983 and 1999)
- Kiwi-nui (North Island brown kiwi, Apteryx mantelli) (introduced 1985 and later)
- Moho-pererū (banded rail, Gallirallus phillipensis assimilis) (introduced 1996–1997)
- Pōpokotea (whitehead, Mohoua albicilla) (introduced 2011)

Failed introductions include:

- Tīeke (North Island saddleback, Philesturnus rufusater) (attempted introduction 1997)
- Kākāriki (red-crowned parakeet, Cyanoramphus novaezelandiae) (attempted introduction 1986 and later)
- Korimako (bellbird, Anthornis melanura) (attempted introduction 1983)
- Tētē-moroiti (Grey teal, Anas gracilis) (attempted introduction 1999)

Six species have self-introduced to the island. These include:

- Spur-winged plover (Vanellus miles novaehollandiae) (arrived 1988)
- Pūtangitangi (paradise shelduck, Tadorna variegata) (arrived 1988)
- Pūkeko (Porphyrio melanotus) (arrived about 2000)
- Miromiro (tomtit, Petroica macrocephala) (arrived 2001)
- Rook (Corvus frugilegus) (arrived 2005 - eliminated by island managers)
- Barbary dove (Streptopelia risoria) (arrived 2011 - eliminated by island managers).

==== North Island brown kiwi ====
Moturoa Island is home to the vulnerable North Island brown kiwi, with the major threat coming from predators, such as dogs, cats, and stoat (Mustela erminea). Across New Zealand 94% of chicks die before breeding in areas where mammalian pest control is not carried out. Between the years 1996 and 2006, total North Island brown kiwi numbers dropped by 15,000 birds.

By the 1970s the entire Moturoa Island kiwi population had been extirpated by pests. The New Zealand Wildlife Service decided to reintroduce kiwi to the island in the 1980s. Three North Island brown kiwi breeding pairs were transported from Waitangi in 1982. A further single kiwi was introduced from a nearby location two or three years later.

The reintroduction was very successful – kiwi numbers today have soared. By 1992, a survey recorded 15 different kiwi – estimating the population to be about 20-25. In 2024, a local landowner said there was "great debate" over how many kiwi live on the island, but "estimates range from 100–300".

In 2024, 21 kiwi were removed from the island to ease pressure on their habitat and food sources. These removed kiwi were safely transported and introduced into the Ōpua State Forest.

In 2009 the Department of Conservation received a report of a kiwi trapped in the WWII gun emplacements at the eastern end of the island – volunteers successfully found and freed the bird.

==== North Island robins ====
In 1999, 19 North Island robins were transported from Mokoia Island in Lake Rotorua and released on Moturoa Island.

==== New Zealand bellbird ====
In 1983, seven New Zealand bellbirds (Anthornis melanura) were introduced to the island, however this was unsuccessful and after a few weeks they were not seen again. Experts suggest this was due to "insufficient habitat repair" and the presence of predators.

=== Pest control ===
To protect the bird life, there is an active pest eradication in action on the Island.

The main threats to bird life found on the island were the Norway rat (Rattus norvegicus), ship rat (R. rattus), house mouse (Mus musculus) and stoat.

Trapping for pests started on the western part of the island in mid-1980. In the early 1990s, this was widened to include the entire island. Since 1998, 55 traps are in action across the island with volunteers checking them monthly. Between 1982 and 2022 a total of 146 rats and 15 stoats have been trapped.

In August 1992, rats were targeted across the entire island with the anticoagulant brodifacoum. Another competitor and predator of small native birds is the common myna (Acridotheres tristis) - a species introduced from India in the 1870s. Starting in June 1995, 457 common myna were trapped in 18 months.

== Etymology ==
In Māori, motu means island and roa can mean long.

== History ==
The Life and Work of Samuel Marsden (Rev J B Marsden) quotes Samuel Marsden's journal where he describes landing on Moturoa in about 1818. The first thing he saw was the tattooed head of a Māori chief "stuck on a pole near the hut" where he was to sleep.

In 1823, a ship called the Brampton hit a nearby reef (now known as Brampton Shoal). On board were both Samuel Leigh and Samuel Marsden. Marsden was evacuated to Moturoa Island where he could see the remaining passengers being rescued from the ship. All passengers were rescued and there was no loss of life.

During WWII, two six-inch gun batteries were established on the island. This was part of larger defence measures, including an observation post and radar station on Cape Brett and a mine station on Moturua Island. The defence of the bay was managed by the Bay of Islands Fortress group.
