= Hat Island =

Hat Island may refer to:

- Sombrero, Anguilla (also known as "Hat Island"), the northernmost island of the Lesser Antilles
- Gedney Island (Washington) (also known as "Hat Island"), an island in Possession Sound, part of Puget Sound, Washington, US
- Hat Island, Washington, a census-designated place in Snohomish County that is coterminous with Gedney Island
- Hat Island (Lake Michigan), located in eastern St. James Township, Charlevoix County, Michigan, US
- Hat Island (Wisconsin), located in the Town of Gibraltar, Door County, Wisconsin, US
- Putulik formerly Hat Island, in the Kitikmeot Region, Nunavut, Canada
- Hat Island (Sverdrup Islands), in the Qikiqtaaluk Region, Nunavut, Canada
- Cocked Hat Island, Nunavut, Canada
- Vatu Vara, Fiji
- Eretoka Island, Vanuatu
- Hat Island (Bay of Islands), New Zealand
- Motupapa Island (Cocked Hat Island)
