= Pakatahi Island =

Small island in New Zealand

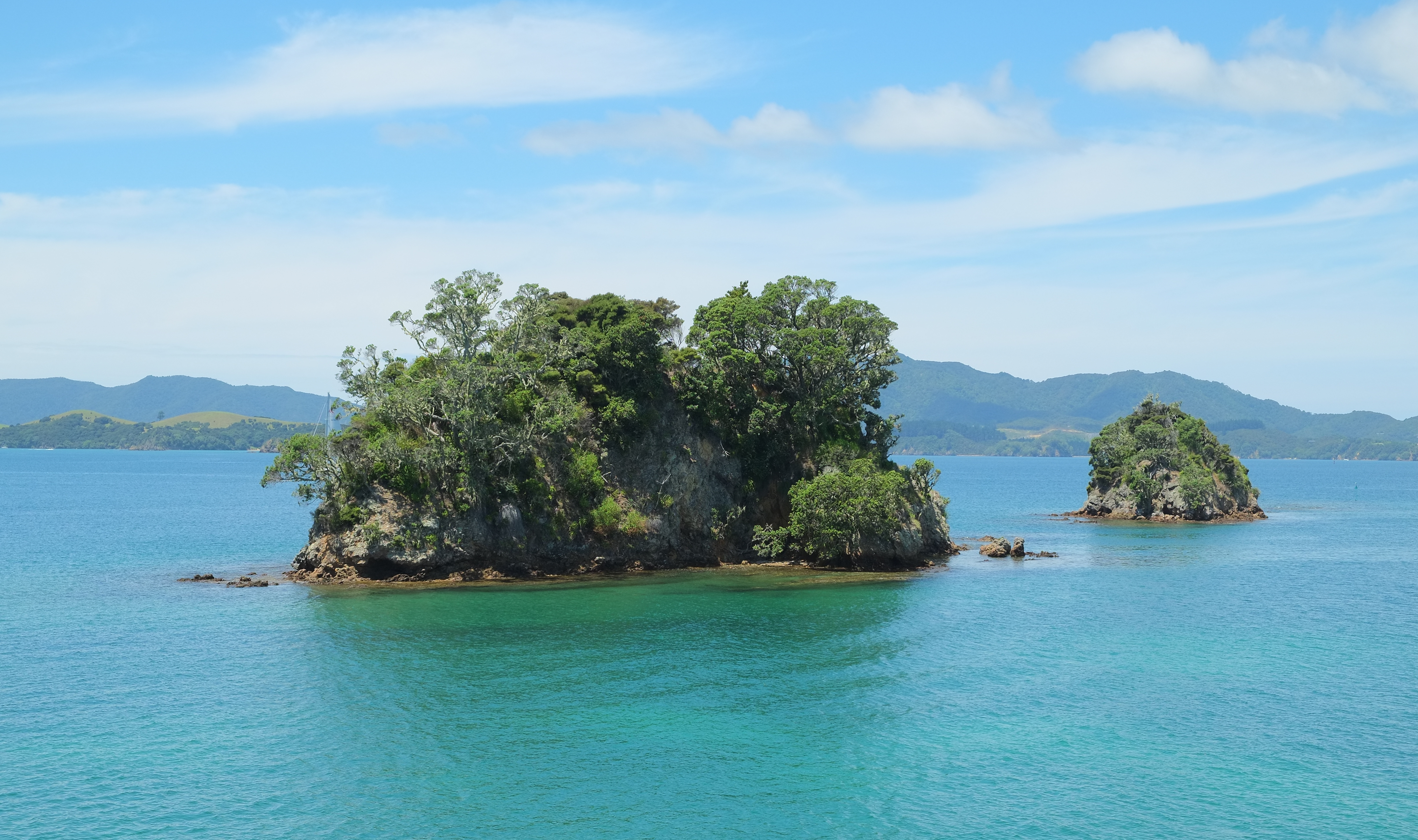
- Pakatahi Island (right) and Kuiamokimoki Island (Left).jpg

- Location within Northland Region

Geography
- Location: Bay of Islands
- Coordinates: 35°13′51.7″S 174°11′59.3″E

Administration
- New Zealand

Pakatahi Island is a small island in the Bay of Islands of New Zealand, located about 7 kilometres (4.3 mi) northeast of Russell. The island is about 700 metres (2,300 ft) off the shore of Moturua Island and about 22 metres (72 ft) from Kuiamokimoki Island.

Pakatahi Island, location within the Bay Of Islands, Northland Region, New Zealand
Pakatahi Island, Bay Of Islands, Northland NZ
