= Kuiamokimoki Island =

Small island in New Zealand

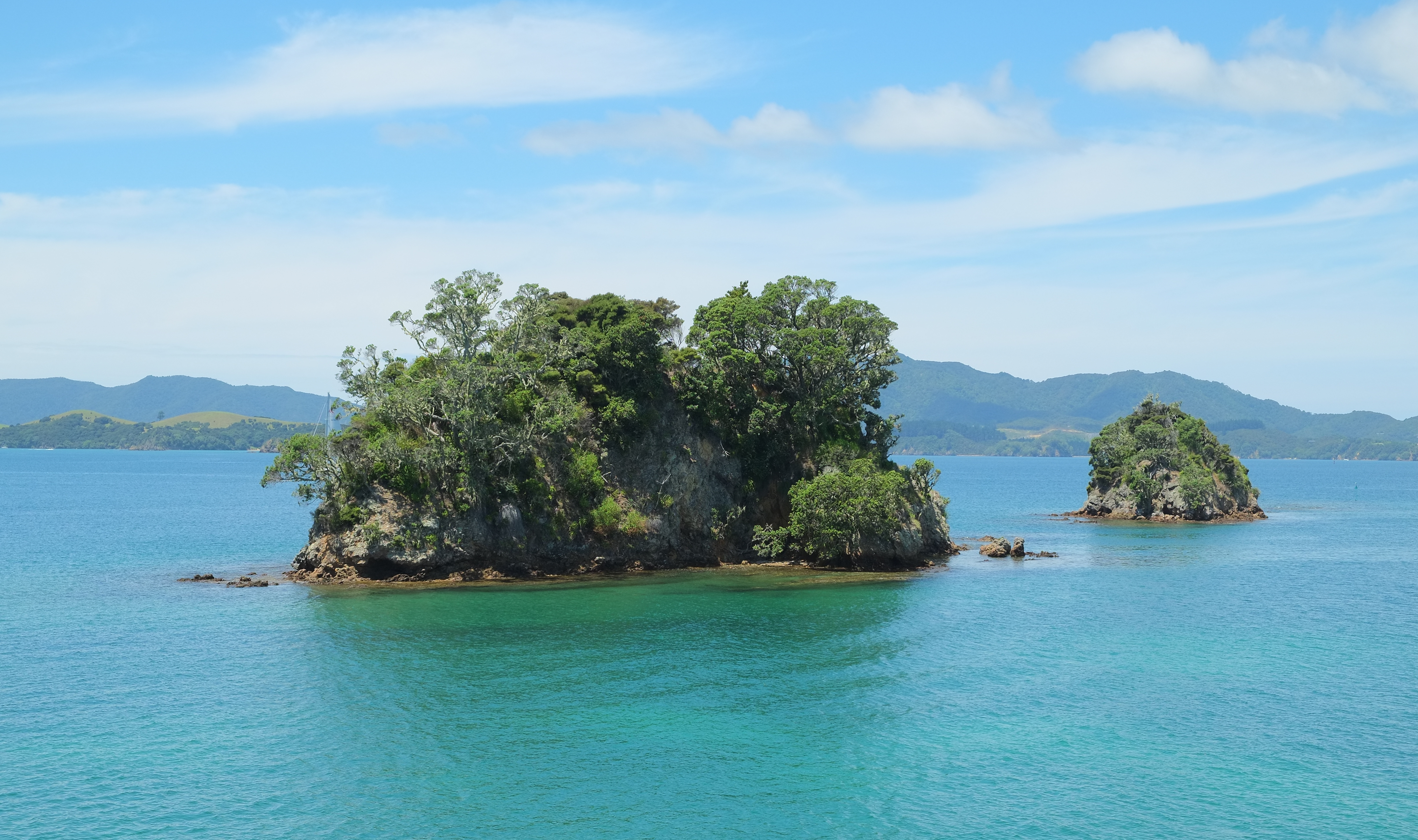
- Kuiamokimoki Island (Left)

- Location within Northland Region

Geography
- Location: Bay of Islands
- Coordinates: 35°13′49.4″S 174°11′54.5″E
- Length: 118 m (387 ft)
- Width: 44 m (144 ft)

Administration
- New Zealand

Kuiamokimoki Island, location within the Bay Of Islands, Northland Region, New Zealand
Kuiamokimoki Island, Bay Of Islands, Northland NZ

Kuiamokimoki Island is a small island in the Bay of Islands of New Zealand, located about 7 kilometres (4.3 mi) northeast of Russell. The island is about 230 metres (750 ft) off the shore of Moturua Island and about 22 metres (72 ft) from Pakatahi Island.
