= Ōkahu Island =

Small island in New Zealand

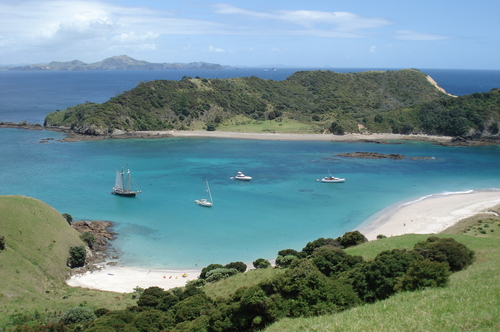
- Ōkahu Island viewed from Waewaetorea Island

- Location within Northland Region

Geography
- Location: Bay of Islands
- Coordinates: 35°11′53″S 174°12′33″E
- Highest elevation: 71 m (233 ft)

Administration
- New Zealand

Ōkahu Island is a small island in the Bay of Islands of New Zealand, located about 10 kilometres (6.2 mi) northeast of Russell.

Ōkahu Island is home to threatened and regionally significant bird species including recent breeding records of the northern New Zealand dotterel and Variable oystercatcher.

In 2026, the spelling of the island's name was officially altered from Okahu to Ōkahu.

Ōkahu Island, location within the Bay of Islands, New Zealand

Ōkahu Island, Bay of Islands, New Zealand
