= Motuwheteke Island =

Small island in New Zealand

- Location within Northland Region

Geography
- Location: Bay of Islands
- Coordinates: 35°12′02.0″S 174°17′19.8″E
- Length: 200 m (700 ft)
- Width: 79 m (259 ft)

Administration
- New Zealand

Motuwheteke Island, location within the Bay Of Islands, Northland Region, New Zealand
Motuwheteke Island, Bay Of Islands, Northland NZ

Motuwheteke Island is a small island in the Bay of Islands of New Zealand, located about 16 kilometres (9.9 mi) northeast of Russell.

The island sits about 60 metres (200 ft) off the shoreline of Cape Brett by the mouth of Maunganui Bay. With an average visibility of 11m and a maximum depth of 23m it is a popular diving spot.
