= Tawiriwiri Island =

Small island in New Zealand

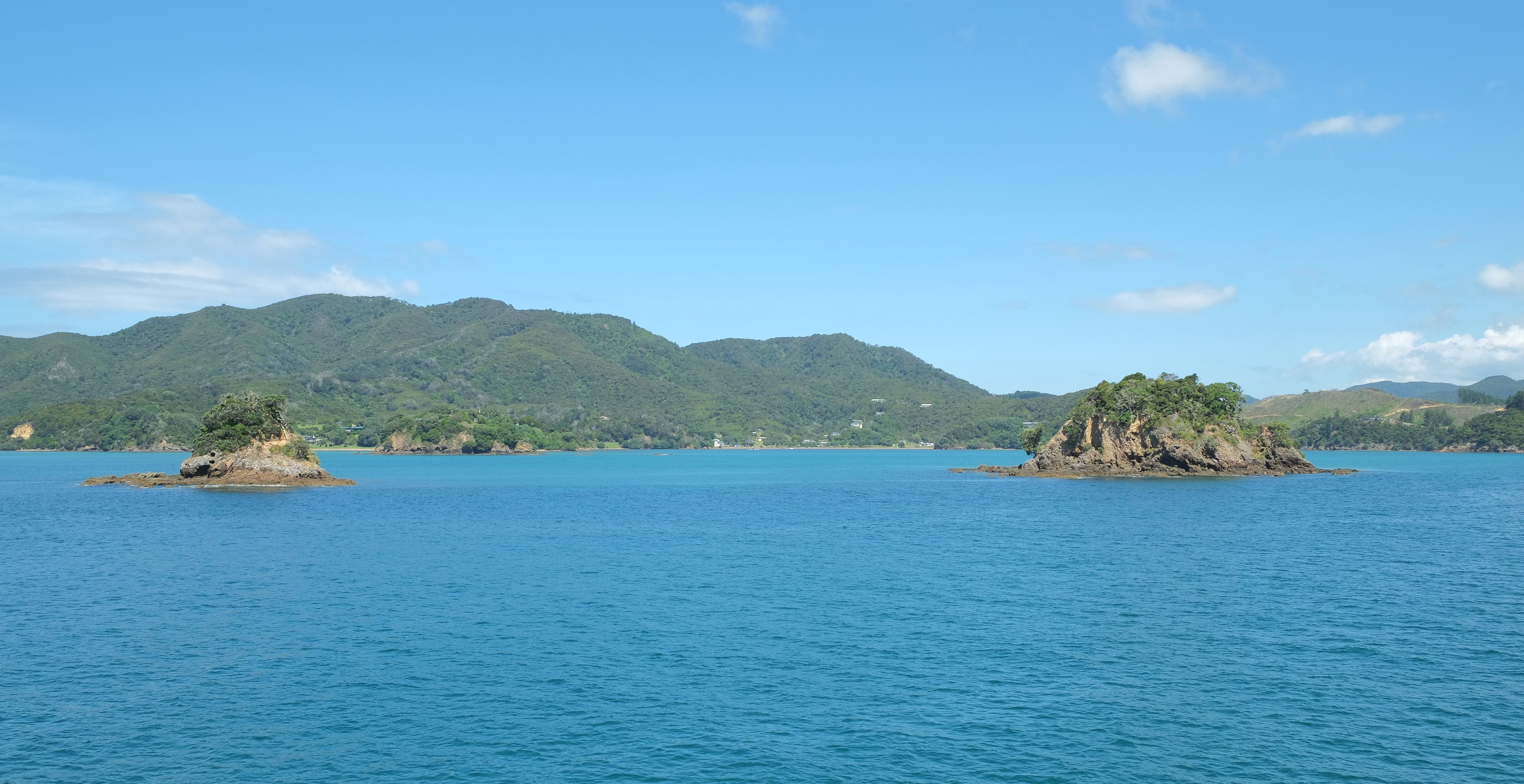
- Tawiriwiri Island (in distance, left of centre) with Mahenotiti Island in the foreground (right)

- Location within Northland Region

Geography
- Location: Bay of Islands
- Coordinates: 35°13′45.7″S 174°15′18.7″E
- Length: 158 m (518 ft)
- Width: 121 m (397 ft)

Administration
- New Zealand

Tawiriwiri Island, location within the Bay Of Islands, Northland Region, New Zealand
Tawiriwiri Island, Bay Of Islands, Northland NZ

Tawiriwiri Island is a small island in the Bay of Islands of New Zealand, located about 12 kilometres (7.5 mi) northeast of Russell. It is situated about 50 metres (160 ft) off a small peninsula known as Te Tawa Hill. Tawiriwiri has Kaimarama Bay to the north and Kaingahoa bay to the south. The nearest islands is Mahenotiti Island.

== Etymology ==
In Māori, 'tāwiriwiri' means either to 'tremble greatly' or a 'tail' (like that of a fish).
