= Putahataha Island =

Small island in New Zealand

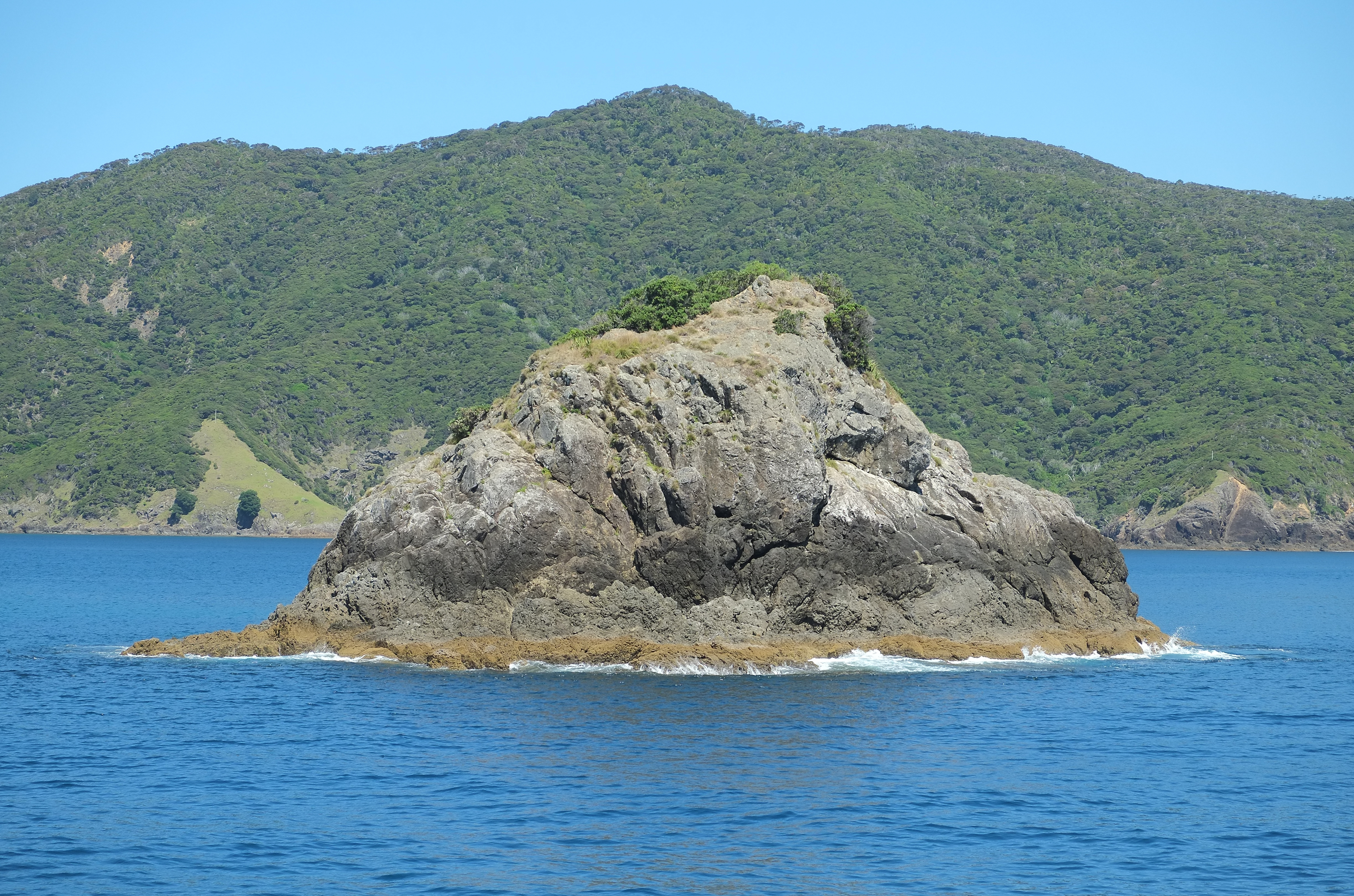
- Putahataha Island in front of Maunganui Bay

- Location within Northland Region

Geography
- Location: Bay of Islands
- Coordinates: 35°11′30.6″S 174°17′33.1″E
- Length: 119 m (390 ft)
- Width: 64 m (210 ft)

Administration
- New Zealand

Putahataha Island is a small island in the Bay of Islands of New Zealand, located about 17 kilometres (11 mi) northeast of Russell.

The island sits about 75 metres (246 ft) off the shoreline of Cape Brett. It is largely a rocky outcrop with little vegetation.

Putahataha is a popular diving spot teeming with aquatic life and featuring an underwater cavern.

Putahataha Island, location within the Bay Of Islands, Northland Region, New Zealand
Putahataha Island, Bay Of Islands, Northland NZ
