= Poroporo Island =

Small island in New Zealand

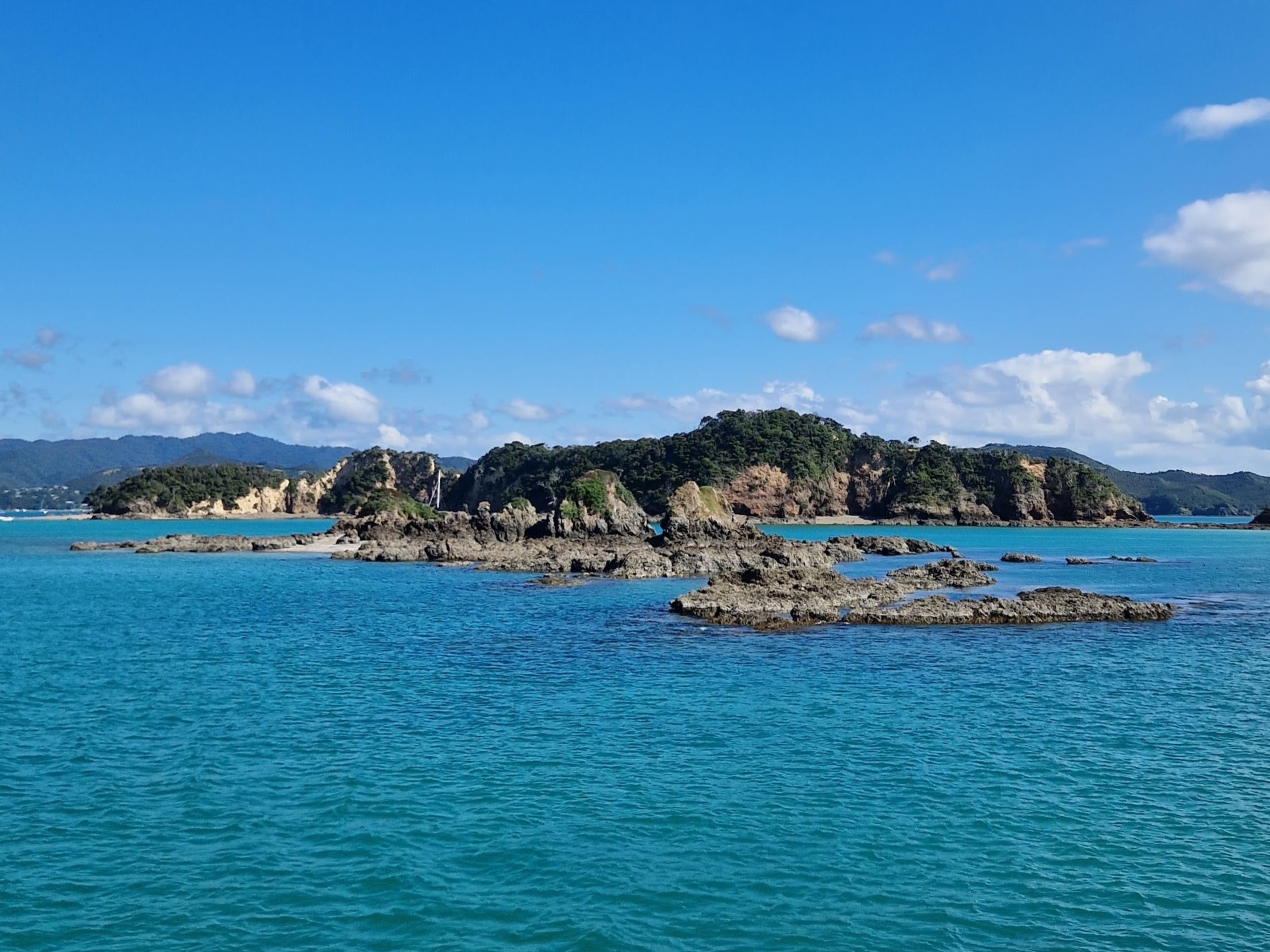
- Poroporo Island with unnamed rocks in front

- Location within Northland Region

Geography
- Location: Bay of Islands
- Coordinates: 35°13′18.3″S 174°14′09.2″E

Administration
- New Zealand

Poroporo Island is a small island in the Bay of Islands of New Zealand, located about 10 kilometres (6.2 mi) northeast of Russell. It is about 650 metres (2,130 ft) from Urupukapuka Island and is directly opposite the entrance to Otehei Bay.

Putahataha Island, location within the Bay Of Islands, Northland Region, New Zealand
Putahataha Island, Bay Of Islands, Northland NZ
