= Hope Reef =

Small island in New Zealand

- Location within Northland Region

Geography
- Location: Bay of Islands
- Coordinates: 35°12′48.1″S 174°14′47.0″E

Administration
- New Zealand

Hope Reef is a small island in the Bay of Islands of New Zealand, located about 12 kilometres (7.5 mi) northeast of Russell. It is situated about 528 metres (1,732 ft) off Urupukapuka Island and is only visible above water at low tide.

Hope Reef is a popular intermediate dive spot with a chance of spotting kingfish and a scallop bed.
