= Ngatokaparangi Islands =

Small island in New Zealand

- Location within Northland Region

Geography
- Location: Bay of Islands
- Coordinates: 35°13′21.4″S 174°12′33.6″E

Administration
- New Zealand

Ngatokaparangi Islands, location within the Bay Of Islands, Northland Region, New Zealand
Ngatokaparangi Islands, Bay Of Islands, Northland NZ

Ngatokaparangi Islands is a group of 3 small rocks in the Bay of Islands of New Zealand, located about 17 kilometres (11 mi) northeast of Russell. They are situated 122 metres (400 ft) off the southern-most point of Motukiekie Island.
