= Motuarohia Island =

Small island (Roberton Island), New Zealand

Roberton Island
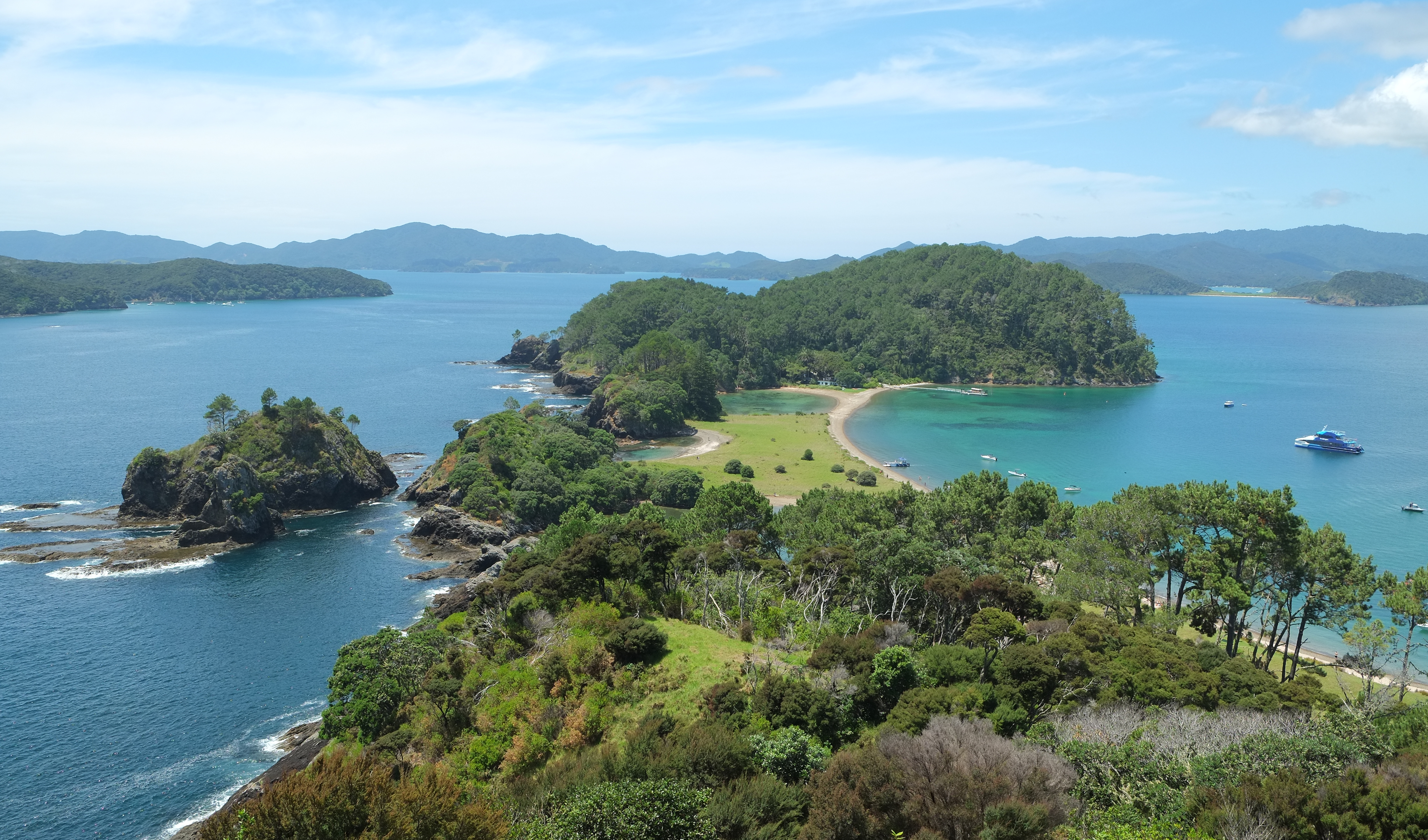
- View eastward over the island from the lookout

- Location within New Zealand

Geography
- Location: Bay of Islands
- Coordinates: 35°14′0″S 174°10′0″E
- Area: 0.634 km^{2} (0.245 sq mi)
- Length: 2 km (1.2 mi)
- Highest elevation: 78 m (256 ft)

Administration
- New Zealand

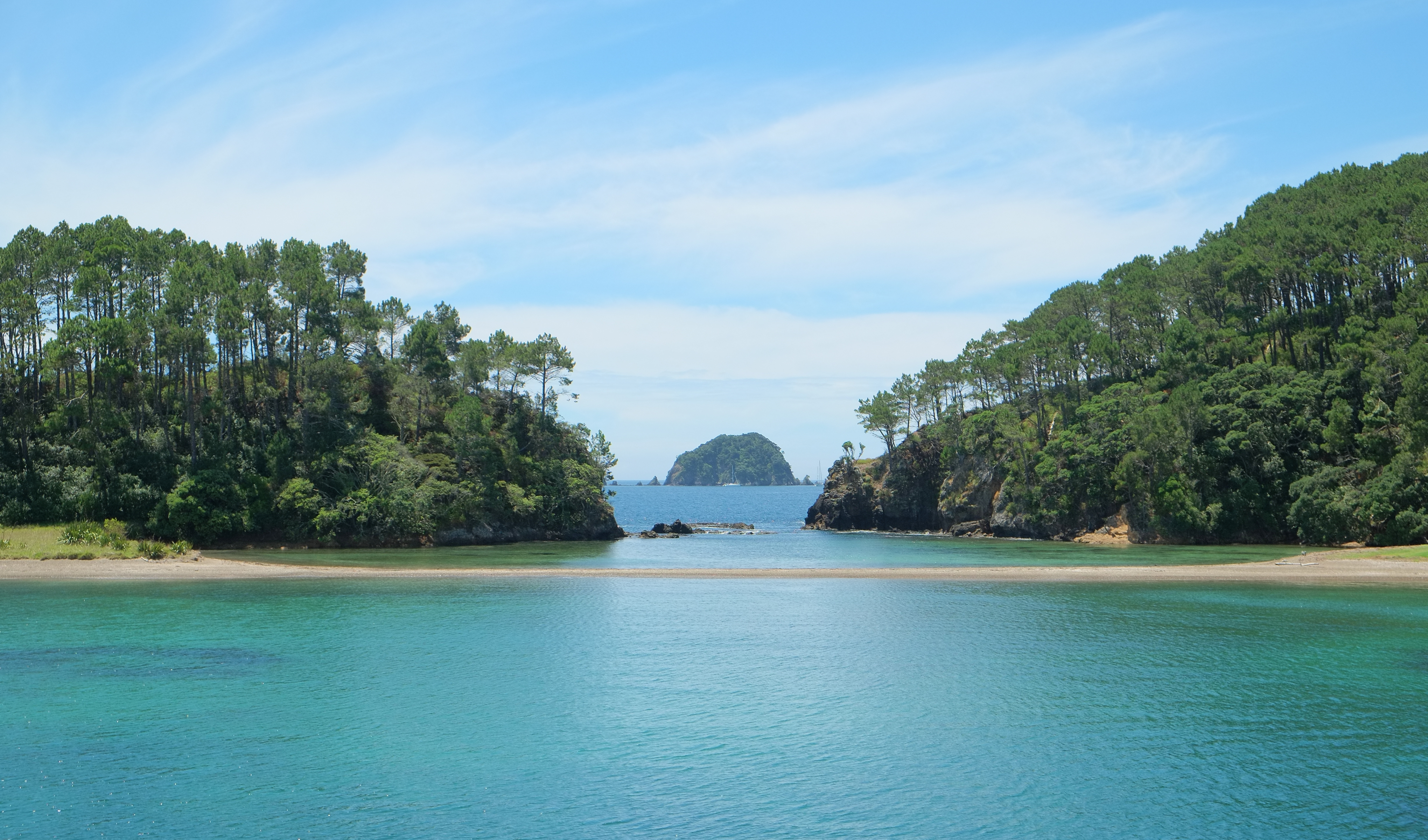
View across the eastern lagoon to Motuoi Island

Motuarohia Island (Roberton Island) is a small island in the Bay of Islands of New Zealand, located about 4 kilometres (2.5 mi) northeast of Russell. The island stretches for 2 kilometres (1.2 mi) east-west, with the south coast offering two bays backed by sandy beaches. The north coast is dominated by steep cliffs in the west, rising to 78 metres (256 ft), and two shallow lagoons in the west. The twin lagoons nearly reach across the island to the bay on the south coast, almost bisecting the island.

The majority of the island is in private ownership, and there is 19.4 hectares (48 acres) of public conservation land in the central section of the island managed by the Department of Conservation.

The New Zealand Ministry for Culture and Heritage gives a translation of "reconnoitred island" for Motuarohia.

== History ==
Motuarohia Island has a long history of human settlement, as evidenced by archaeological sites including a pa site, terraces and pits. In 1769, Captain James Cook anchored HMS Endeavour just south of the island, hence one of the bays is named Cook's Cove. His reports indicated that there were 200 to 300 Maori on the island and a pa at the eastern tip of the island.

In 1839 the Island was bought by a whaler and sealer, John Roberton, from Ngāpuhi chiefs, Te Wharerahi and Rewa. Roberton established a farm on the island before drowning in 1840, leaving the island to his widow, Elizabeth Roberton and their two children.

Some local Māori claimed the land should return to its former owners after the death of John Roberton. In 1841 Elizabeth Roberton attended a land commission hearing in Kororāreka where the chiefs Wharerahi and Rewa supported her claim to the land.

After the death of Rewa's daughter, Moewaka, Elizabteh would come into custody of Moeweka's daughter Eliza Isabella Brind. To run the farm Elizabteh hired a farm manager, Thomas Bull, and farmhand Wiremu Kīngi Maketū. Bull mistreated Maketū resulting in Maketū murdering Bull, Roberton, her two children and Isabella Brind. Maketū faced trial and became the first person sentenced to death in New Zealand.

Ownership of parts of the island changed hands later, and since 1979 the central section of the island, including the lagoons, is publicly accessible Department of Conservation land.

== Conservation ==
As part of the Department of Conservation's Project Island Song, Motuarohia is pest-free and home to a number of endangered bird species, such as whitehead, brown kiwi, and New Zealand dotterel during breeding season.

Native forest is regenerating in most parts of the island, in particular in an area of felled pine at the western end.

== Recreation ==
The twin lagoons in the central section of the island are surrounded by kikuyu grass flats. This area is used as a stopover point by small tour boats from Paihia and Russell, although not as popular as the much larger Urupukapuka Island nearby. At Motuarohia Island, the tour boats anchor in the bay and use a small tender to ferry passengers to the sandy beach. A walking track leads from this area to a lookout point overlooking the twin lagoons. There is also a walking track to the pa site, and an educational underwater trail for snorkellers.

== See also ==
- List of islands of New Zealand
