= Waewaetorea Island =

Small island, New Zealand

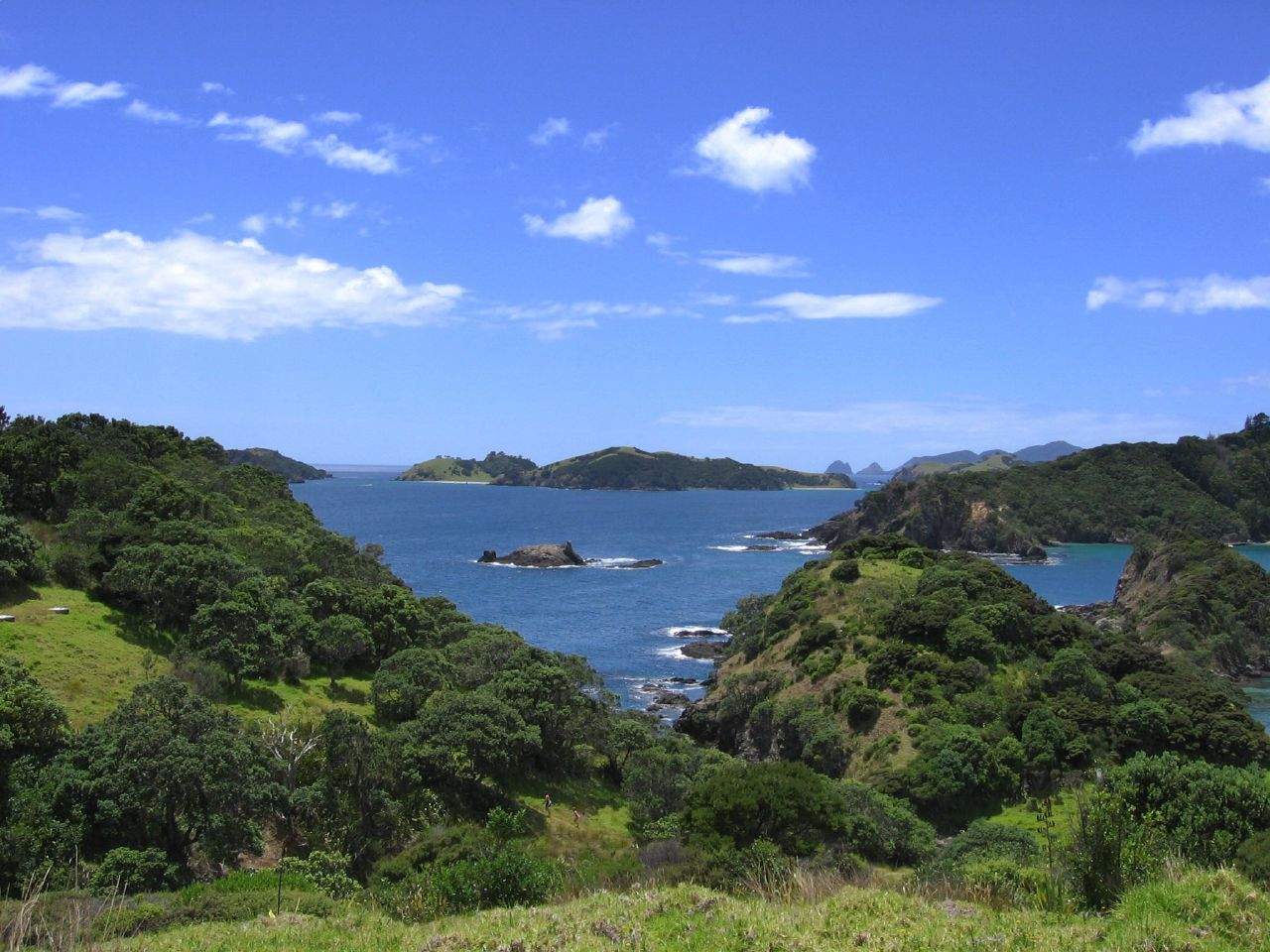
- Waewaetorea (centre) as viewed from Motukiekie Island

- Location within Northland Region

Geography
- Location: Bay of Islands
- Coordinates: 35°12′15″S 174°12′58″E

Administration
- New Zealand

Waewaetorea Island is a small island in the Bay of Islands of New Zealand, located about 10 kilometres (6.2 mi) northeast of Russell. It is a neighbouring island to Urupukapuka Island.
