= Motutapu Island (Bay of Islands) =

Small island in New Zealand

- Location within Northland Region

Geography
- Location: Bay of Islands
- Coordinates: 35°11′34.4″S 174°01′04.7″E

Administration
- New Zealand

Motutapu Island, location within the Bay Of Islands, Northland Region, New Zealand

Motutapu Island, Bay Of Islands, Northland NZ

Motutapu Island is a small island in the Bay of Islands of New Zealand, located about 12 kilometres (7.5 mi) northwest of Russell. It is situated near Blacksmiths Bay, within the Kerikeri Inlet.

== Etymology ==
In Māori, 'motu' means island and 'tapu' is something restricted, prohibited, set apart or sacred. Motutapu as a 'sacred' or 'sanctuary' island, is a term used for various islands in a number of Polynesian cultures.
