= Motutui Island =

Small island in New Zealand

- Location within Northland Region

Geography
- Location: Bay of Islands
- Coordinates: 35°10′16.3″S 174°07′19.5″E
- Highest elevation: 63 m (207 ft)

Administration
- New Zealand

Motutui Island, location within the Bay Of Islands, Northland Region, New Zealand
Motutui Island, Bay Of Islands, Northland NZ

Motutui Island is a tidal island in the Bay of Islands of New Zealand, located about 10 kilometres (6.2 mi) north of Russell. It is located just off the Howe Point on Cape Wiwki on the Purepua Peninsula.

== Etymology ==
In Māori, 'motu' means island. 'Tui' could be referring to the endemic bird (Tūī), or the Māori name Tui.
