= Harakeke Island =

Small island in New Zealand

Nickname: Galakek Island
- Location within Northland Region

Geography
- Location: Bay of Islands
- Coordinates: 35°09′16″S 174°07′58.4″E
- Highest elevation: 90 m (300 ft)

Administration
- New Zealand

Harakeke Island, location within the Bay Of Islands, Northland Region, New Zealand
Harakeke Island, Bay Of Islands, Northland NZ

Harakeke Island is a small island in the Bay of Islands of New Zealand, located about 12 kilometres (7.5 mi) north of Russell. It is situated at the north-eastern extent of the Bay of Islands, about 377 metres (1,237 ft) off the Purerua Peninsula.

It is the largest of an island cluster known as Cape Wiwiki. About 912 metres (2,992 ft) to the north-east of Harakeke is Tikitiki Island (Ninepin Island).

Although less common, some maps list Harakeke Island as Galakek Island.

In 2015, the New Zealand Department of Conservation declared Harakeke Island pest free.

== Etymology ==
Harekeke is the Māori word for flax, a native plant used for weaving and basket making.
