= Black Rocks (Bay of Islands) =

Island in New Zealand

- Interactive map of Black Rocks

Geography
- Coordinates: 35.203306°S 174.112778°E

Administration
- New Zealand
- Region: Northland

Demographics
- Population: uninhabited

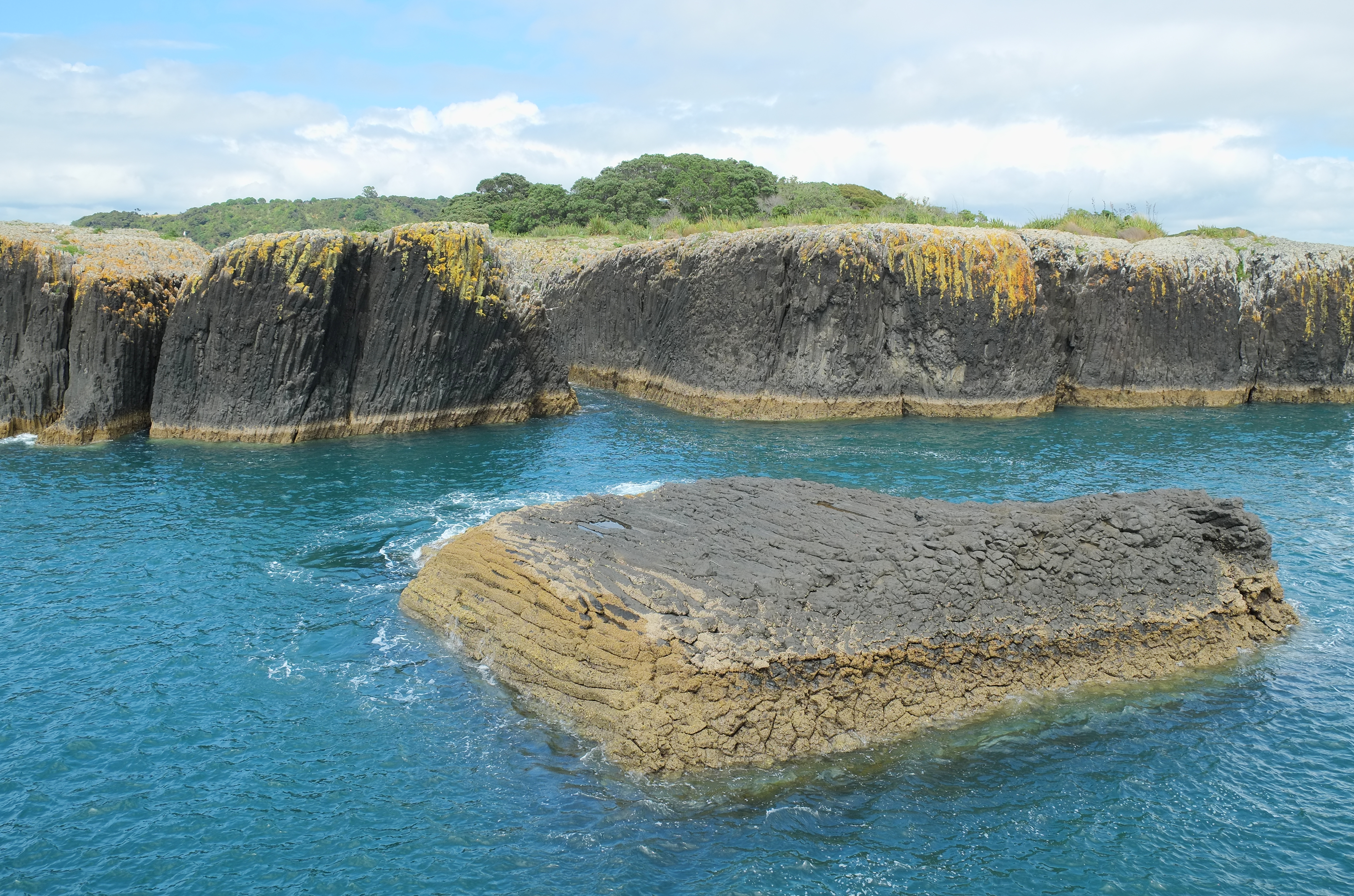
Volcanic rock that has fallen over sideways at Black Rocks northeast of Moturoa Island. The rocks in the background are the visible tops of basalt lava flows about 1.2 million years ago from volcanic eruptions. The rock in the foreground has fallen over some time ago, clearly evident by the pattern of the rock.

Black Rocks are a group of small islands in the Bay of Islands in New Zealand. It is north of Battleship Rock and to the north-east of Moturoa Island.

== See also ==
- List of islands of New Zealand
