= Round Island (Bay of Islands) =

Small island in New Zealand

- Location within Northland Region

Geography
- Location: Bay of Islands
- Coordinates: 35°13′41″S 174°14′12.1″E
- Length: 186 m (610 ft)
- Width: 131 m (430 ft)

Administration
- New Zealand

Round Island, location within the Bay Of Islands, Northland Region, New Zealand
Round Island, Bay Of Islands, Northland NZ

Round Island is a small island in the Bay of Islands of New Zealand, located about 11 kilometres (6.8 mi) northeast of Russell. The Island is about 41 metres (135 ft) off the south-east shore of Urupukapuka Island.

Despite its name, Round Island is more triangular in shape.
