= Motukauri Island (Bay of Islands) =

Small island in New Zealand

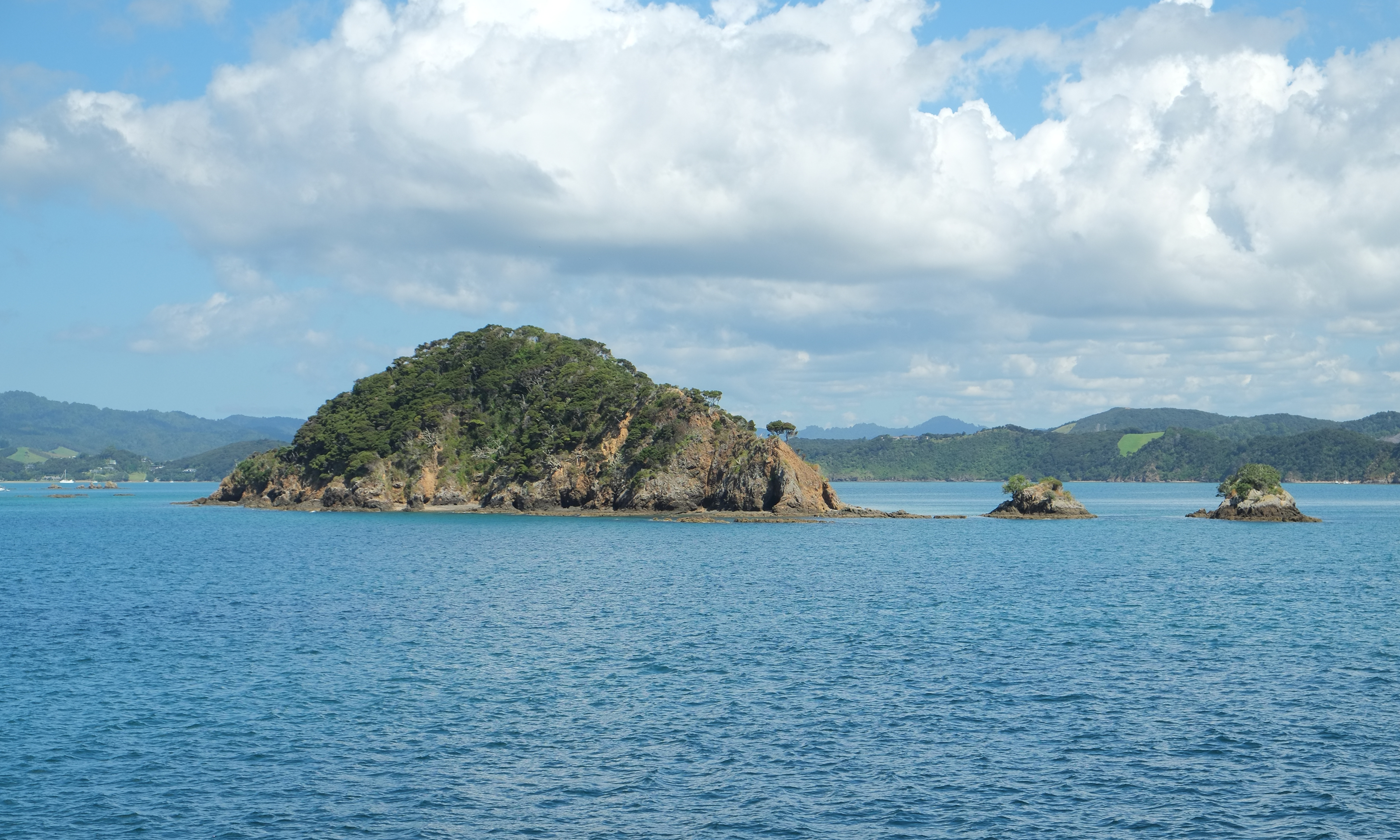
- Motukauri Island in front of Manawaora Bay

- Location within Northland Region

Geography
- Location: Bay of Islands
- Coordinates: 35°15′00.9″S 174°11′06″E
- Length: 374 m (1227 ft)
- Width: 142 m (466 ft)

Administration
- New Zealand

Putahataha Island, location within the Bay Of Islands, Northland Region, New Zealand
Putahataha Island, Bay Of Islands, Northland NZ

Motukauri Island is a small island in the Bay of Islands of New Zealand, located about 6 kilometres (3.7 mi) east of Russell. It lies about 200 kilometres (120 mi) off the Orokawa Peninsula.

Moto translates to Island and kauri refers to the Agathis Tree - also known as the kauri.

There are three other islands named Motukauri in the Northland Region - most likely due to the meaning of the name in Maori:

- Motukauri Island (Hokianga Harbour) - geographically this is a peninsular but known as an Island due to its narrow isthmus (only 18m wide at its narrowest).
- Motukauri Island (Whangaruru Harbour)
- Motukauri Island (Te Horoatetamingi Point)
