= Motutara Rock (Twins Rock) =

Small island in New Zealand

Nickname: Twin Rocks
- Location within Northland Region

Geography
- Location: Bay of Islands
- Coordinates: 35°10′44.8″S 174°17′43.3″E

Administration
- New Zealand

Motutara Rock, location within the Bay Of Islands, Northland Region, New Zealand
Motutara Rock, Bay Of Islands, Northland NZ

Motutara Rock (Twins Rock) is a small island with two stacks in the Bay of Islands of New Zealand, located about 18 kilometres (11 mi) northeast of Russell. These rocks are sometimes referred to as The Sisters.

== Etymology ==
In Māori, 'motu' means island and 'tara' is a peak or point.
