= Bay of Islands =

Area in the Far North District, New Zealand

- Te Pēwhairangi / Ipipiri (Māori)
- Location within New Zealand
- Location: North Island
- Coordinates: 35°12′S 174°10′E
- Type: Bay
- Part of: Pacific Ocean
- Basin countries: New Zealand

Bay of Islands

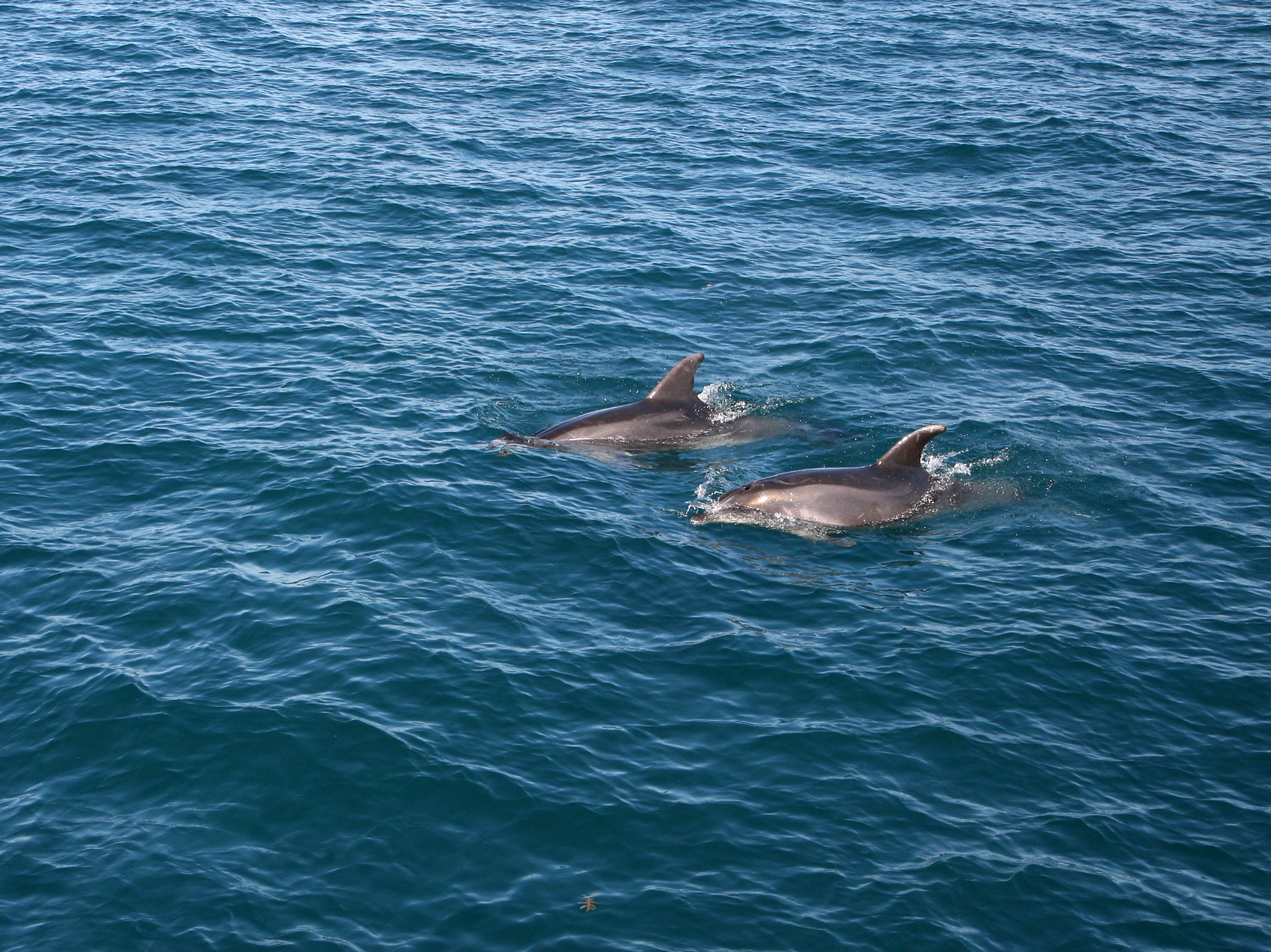
Dolphins in the Bay of Islands

The Bay of Islands (Māori: Te Pēwhairangi) is an area on the east coast of the Far North District of the North Island of New Zealand. It is one of the most popular fishing, sailing and tourist destinations in the country, and has been renowned internationally for its big-game fishing ever since American author Zane Grey publicised it in the 1930s. It is 60 km (37 mi) north-west of the city of Whangārei. Cape Reinga, at the northern tip of the country, is about 210 km (130 mi) by road further to the north-west.

== Etymology ==
In te reo Māori, the bay is known by several names, including Te Pēwhairangi, Ipipiri, and Tokerau, a name given by early Māori ancestors referencing a place in the Māori homeland. The wider Bay of Islands area, including the plain surrounding Waimate North, is traditionally known as Taiamai, a name shortened from the Ngāpuhi whakataukī (proverb) Ka kata ngā pūriri ō Taiamai ("the pūriri trees are laughing with joy"), a phrase used to express delight in the world, or to welcome an honoured guest. The bay's English name was given on 27 November 1769 by Captain James Cook during his first voyage, when Cook and his crew landed on Motuarohia Island.

== Geography ==
The bay is an irregularly-shaped 16 km (10 mi)-wide, 260 km^{2} (100 mi^{2}) drowned valley system and a natural harbour. It contains 144 islands, of which the largest is Urupukapuka, and numerous peninsulas and inlets. The three largest inlets are Waikare Inlet in the south, and Kerikeri and Te Puna (Mangonui) inlets in the north-west. The Purerua Peninsula, north of Te Puna Inlet, separates the north-western part of the bay from the Pacific Ocean, and Cape Brett Peninsula extends 10 km (6 mi) into the ocean at the eastern end of the bay. The biggest town is Kerikeri, followed by Paihia. The small town of Russell is located at the end of a short peninsula that extends into the bay from the southeast.

== History ==
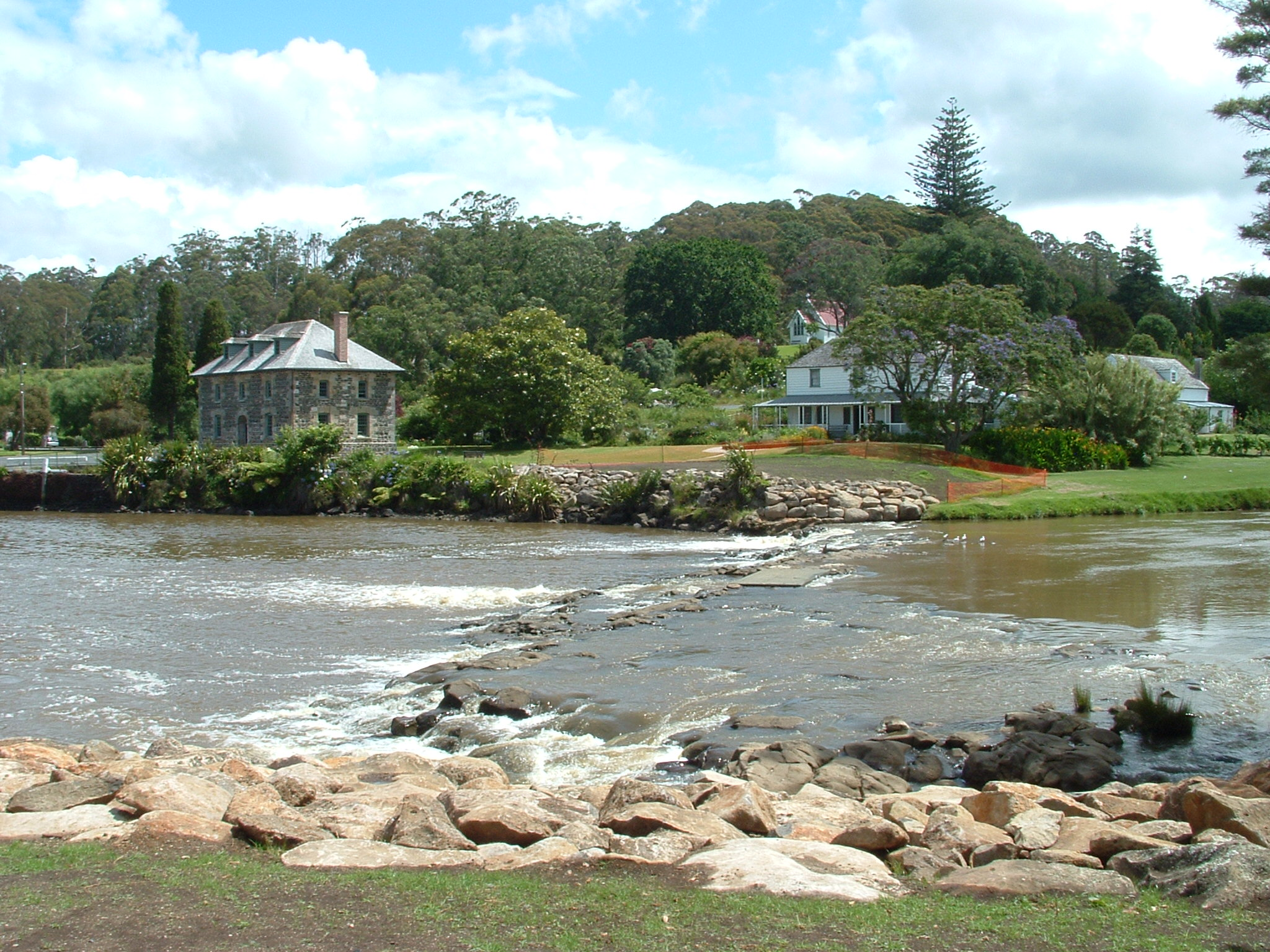
Kerikeri

About 700 years ago, the Mātaatua, one of the large Māori migration canoes which journeyed to New Zealand from Hawaiki, was sailed to the Bay of Islands (from the Bay of Plenty) by Puhi, a progenitor of the Ngāpuhi iwi (tribe) which today is the largest in the country. Māori settled and multiplied throughout the bay and on several of its many islands to establish various tribes such as the Ngāti Miru at Kerikeri. Many notable Māori were born in the Bay of Islands, including Hōne Heke who several times cut down the flagpole at Kororāreka (Russell) to start the Flagstaff War.

Many of the Māori settlements later played important roles in the development of New Zealand, such as Okiato (the nation's first capital), Waitangi (where the Treaty of Waitangi would later be signed) and Kerikeri, (which was an important departure point for inland Māori going to sea, and later site of the first permanent mission station in the country). Some of the islands became notable as well, such as Motu Apo (Te Pahi Island) where 60 of chief Te Pahi's people were killed as revenge after he was wrongly accused of being responsible for the Boyd Massacre at Whangaroa.

The first European to visit the area was Captain Cook, who named the region in 1769. The Bay of Islands was the first area in New Zealand to be settled by Europeans. Whalers arrived towards the end of the 18th century, while the first missionaries settled in 1814. The first full-blooded European child recorded as being born in the country, Thomas King, was born in 1815 at Oihi Bay in the Bay of Islands (there have been unsubstantiated claims that a European girl was born earlier at the Dusky Sound settlement in the South Island).

The bay has many interesting historic towns including Paihia, Russell, Waitangi and Kerikeri. Russell, formerly known as Kororāreka, was the first permanent European settlement in New Zealand, and dates from the early 19th century. Kerikeri contains many historic sites from the earliest European colonial settlement in the country. These include the Mission House, also called Kemp House, which is the oldest wooden structure still standing in New Zealand. The Stone Store, a former storehouse, is the oldest stone building in New Zealand, construction having begun on 19 April 1832. These settlements also reared horses during this time to the fascination of local Māori who called them "man-carrying dogs" (kurī waha tangata).

The Bay of Islands was visited in the 19th century by sealing ships and whaling ships that hunted in the ocean around New Zealand, often bartering with local iwi to restock their food supplied with local potatoes and pork. In December 1835 Charles Darwin visited the Bay of Islands in HMS Beagle. In February 1840, some members of the United States Exploring Expedition were present at the initial signing of the Treaty of Waitangi at Waitangi.

In a 2006 study, the Bay of Islands was found to have the second bluest sky in the world, after Rio de Janeiro.

A new fast boat manufactured by the Explore Group was introduced in the Bay of Islands in 2019 to take visitors to the Hole in the Rock at speed. The daily transport facility can seat up to 30 passengers and will ply several times during the day.

== Cream Trip ==
In 1886, Albert Ernest Fuller launched the sailing ship Undine in the Bay of Islands to deliver coal supplies to the islands within the bay. With the fitting of a motor in the early 20th century, Fuller was able to deliver the coal and essential supplies to communities as far out as Cape Brett.

In 1927 Fuller acquired Cream Trip from Eddie Lane – with the facilities on board to transport cream from the islands, and by the 1960s, the newly commissioned Bay Belle started this run.

Although a modern catamaran now takes this historical route of the original Cream Trip, Bay Belle continues to transport visitors and locals between Paihia and Russell throughout the day.

== Islands within the bay ==
The islands in the bay include:

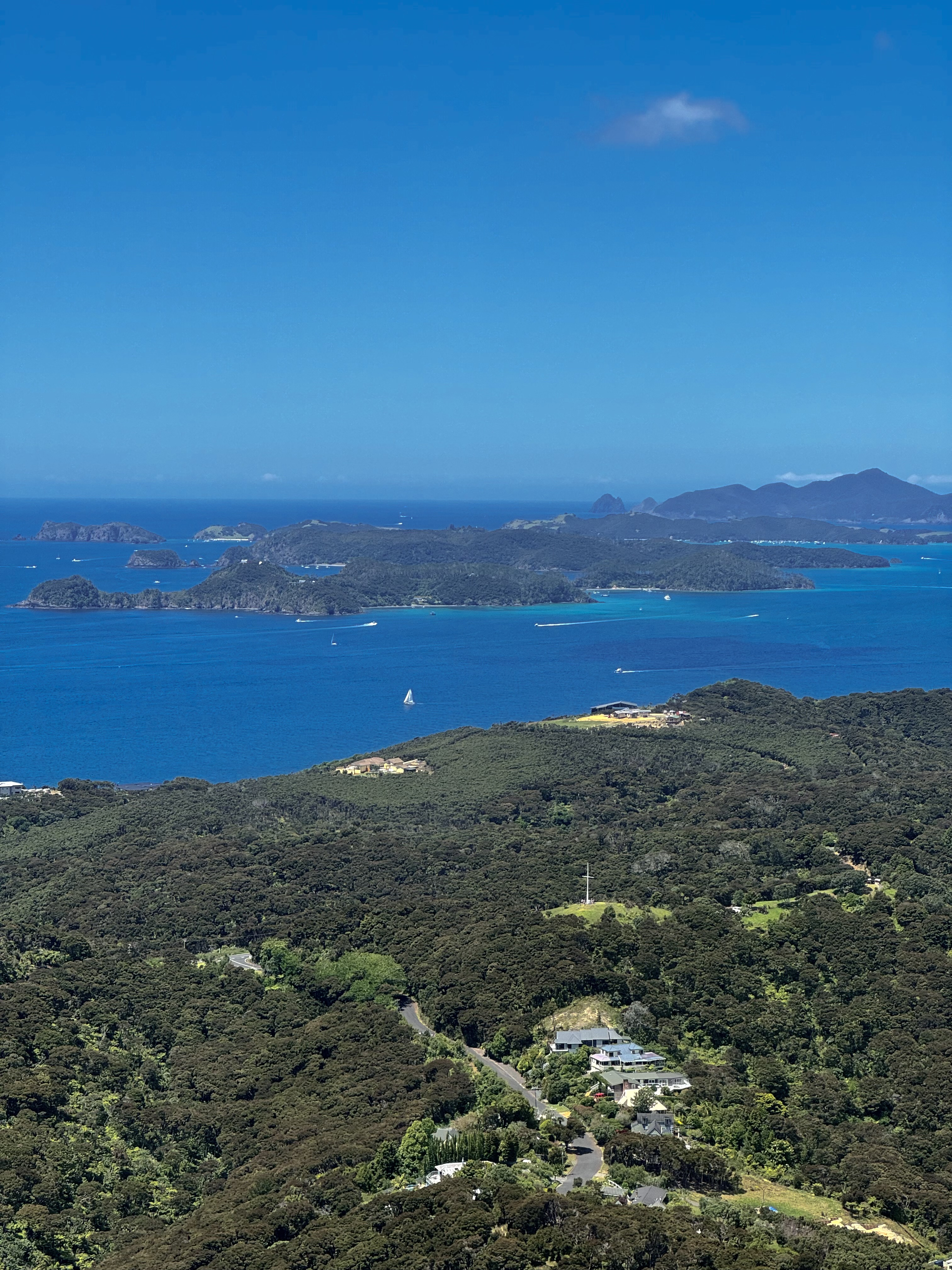
Bay of Islands looking north-east along the route of the Cream Trip, with Flagstaff Hill in the foreground. From front to back: Roberton Island and Moturua Island; left to right beyond them, Ōkahu, Waewaetoria and Urupukapuka Islands; in the distance, Cape Brett and, further out, Piercy Island.

- Urupukapuka Island
- Waewaetorea Island
- Motukiekie Island
- Moturua Island
- Motuarohia Island
- Putahataha Island
- Motuwheteke Island
- Motutara Rock (Twins Rock)
- Hope Reef
- Hat Island
- Tawiriwiri Island
- Mahenotiti Island
- Te Ao Island
- Round Island
- Poroporo Island
- Ōkahu Island
- Harakeke Island
- Motutara Island
- Ngatokaparangi Islands
- Rangiatea Island
- Motuoi Island
- Te Miko Reef
- Kuiamokimoki Island
- Pakatahi Island
- Motukauri Island
- Te Korowhiti Rock
- Te Waha Island
- Motumaire Island
- Taylor Island
- Kaiaraara Island
- Motuarahi Island
- Toretore Island
- Tikitiki Island
- Marriott Island
- Motumareti Island
- Moturoa Island
- Black Rocks
- Pirikawau Island
- Wainui Island
- Taranaki Island
- Aroha Island
- Motutapu Island
- Tikorangi Island
- Motupapa Island
- Rahui Island
- Motuone Island
- Hen and Chickens
- Te Pahi Islands
- Motuterahiki Island
- Howe Rock
- Motutui Island
- Putahataha Island
- Otuwhanga Island
- Motukokako Island
- Tiheru Island
- Mahenotapuku (Bird Rock)
- Kohangaatara Point
- Motungarara Island

=== Minor reefs and rocks ===
- Battleship Rock
- Paramena Reef
- Te Nunuhe Rock (Whale Rock)
- Dead Whale Reef
- Hermione Rock
- Micky Rocks
- Oturori Rock
- Shag Rock
- Tiktiki Rock
