= Motupapa Island (Cocked Hat Island) =

Small island in New Zealand

- Location within Northland Region

Geography
- Location: Bay of Islands
- Coordinates: 35°11′57.1″S 174°02′57.2″E

Administration
- New Zealand

Motupapa Island (Cocked Hat Island), location within the Bay Of Islands, Northland Region, New Zealand
Motupapa Island (Cocked Hat Island), Bay Of Islands, Northland NZ

Motupapa Island (Cocked Hat Island) is a small island in the Bay of Islands of New Zealand, located about 9.5 kilometres (5.9 mi) northwest of Russell. It sits near the mouth of the Kerikeri Inlet.
