= Hat Island (Bay of Islands) =

Small island in New Zealand

- Location within Northland Region

Geography
- Location: Bay of Islands
- Coordinates: 35°13′08.8″S 174°15′09.5″E

Administration
- New Zealand

Hat Island, location within the Bay Of Islands, Northland Region, New Zealand

Hat Island, Bay Of Islands, Northland NZ

Hat Island is a small island in the Bay of Islands of New Zealand, located about 12.5 kilometres (7.8 mi) northeast of Russell. It is situated about 180 metres (590 ft) off the Rawhiti Peninsula.
