= Motukiekie Island =

Small island in New Zealand

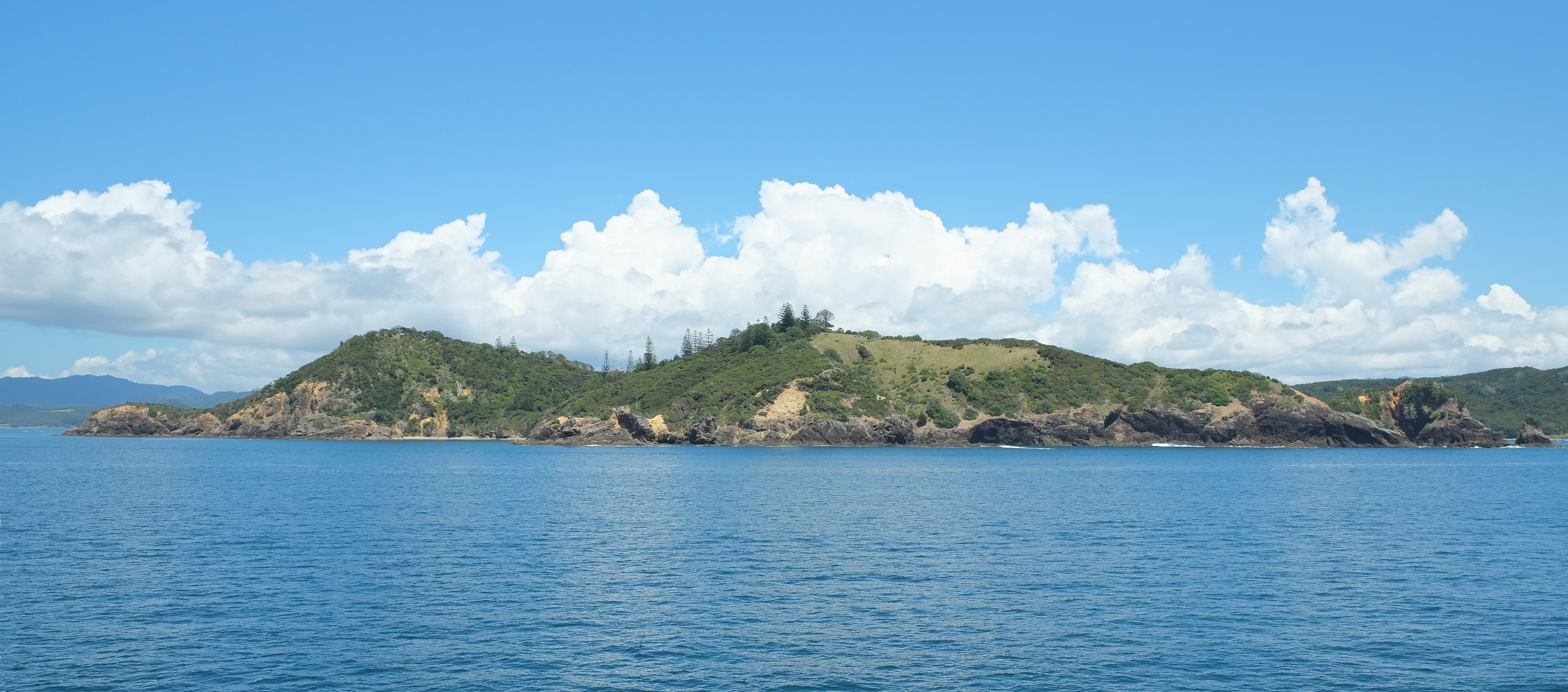
- North of Motukiekie Island

- Location within Northland Region

Geography
- Location: Bay of Islands
- Coordinates: 35°13′01″S 174°12′09″E
- Length: 1.2 km (0.75 mi)
- Width: 0.57 km (0.354 mi)
- Highest elevation: 82 m (269 ft)

Administration
- New Zealand

Motukiekie Island is a small island in the Bay of Islands of New Zealand, located about 8 kilometres (5.0 mi) northeast of Russell.

Motukiekie is a narrow island located northeast of Moturua, central among the southeastern group of large islands. The island features a prominent central ridge with several steep, short ridges extending outward. It has a few small, exposed bays but lacks deep, sheltered bays.

== Etymology ==
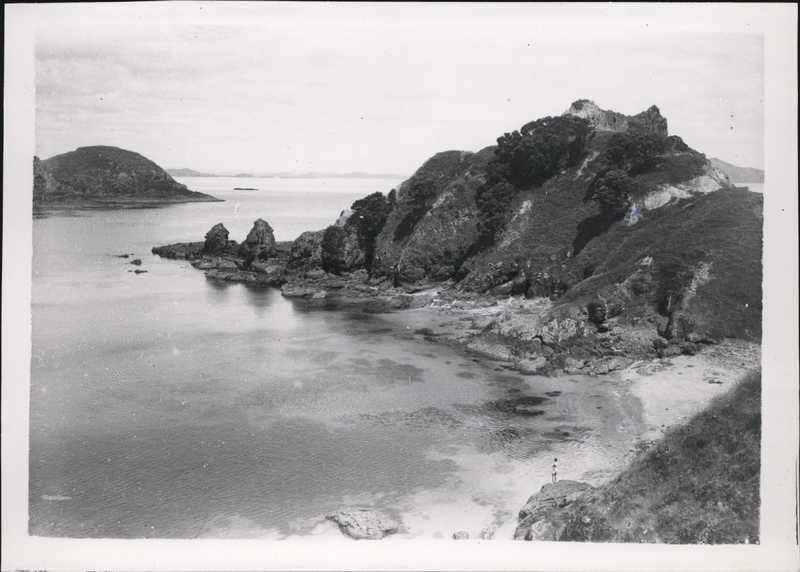
Motukiekie Island in 1910, showing old pā site

In Māori, 'motu' means island and 'kiekie' is the native vine Freycinetia banksii.
