= Mahenotiti Island =

Small island in New Zealand

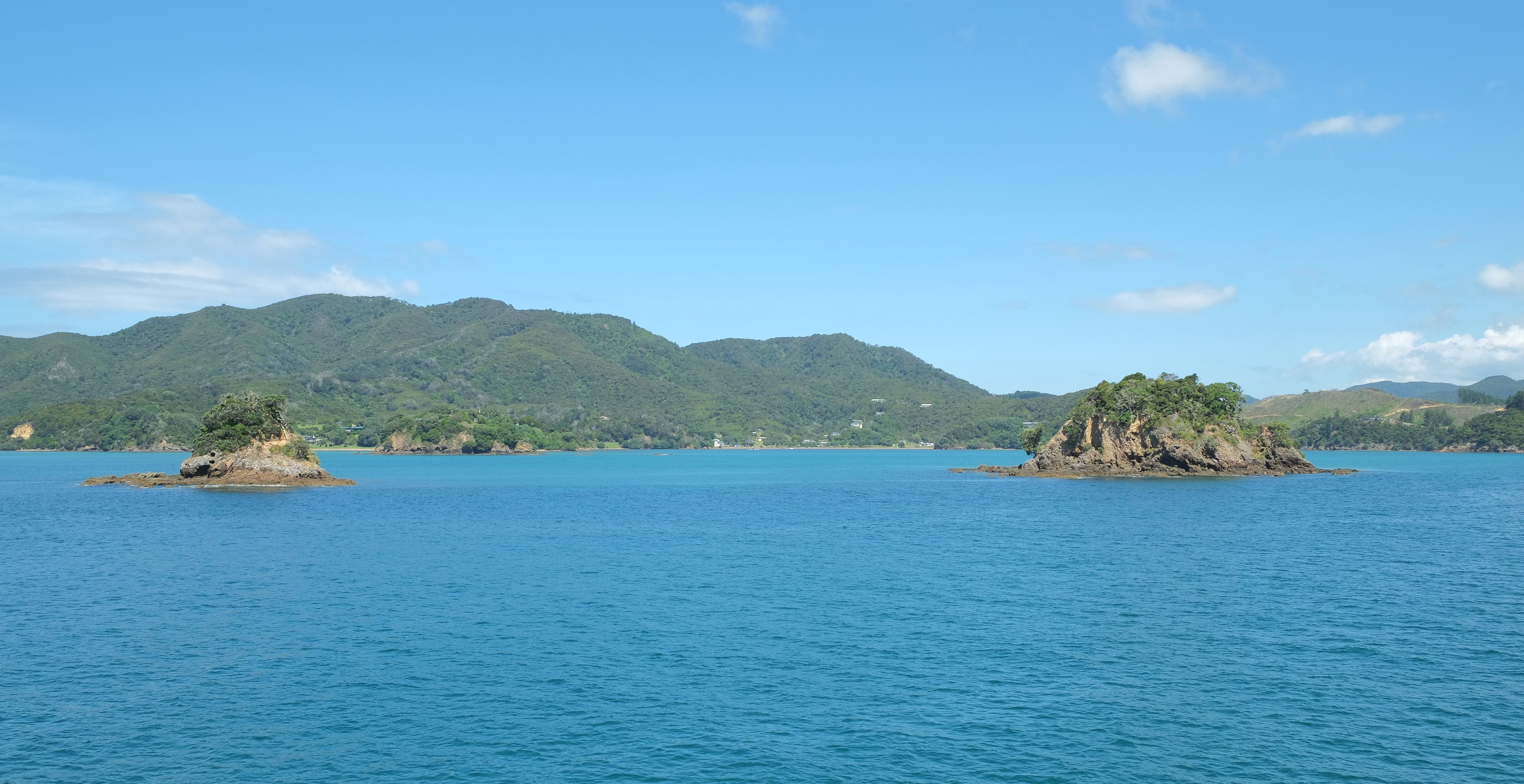
- Mahenotiti Island (right) in front of Tawiriwiri Island and Kaingahoa Bay

- Location within Northland Region

Geography
- Location: Bay of Islands
- Coordinates: 35°13′39.2″S 174°14′53.2″E

Administration
- New Zealand

Putahataha Island, location within the Bay Of Islands, Northland Region, New Zealand
Putahataha Island, Bay Of Islands, Northland NZ

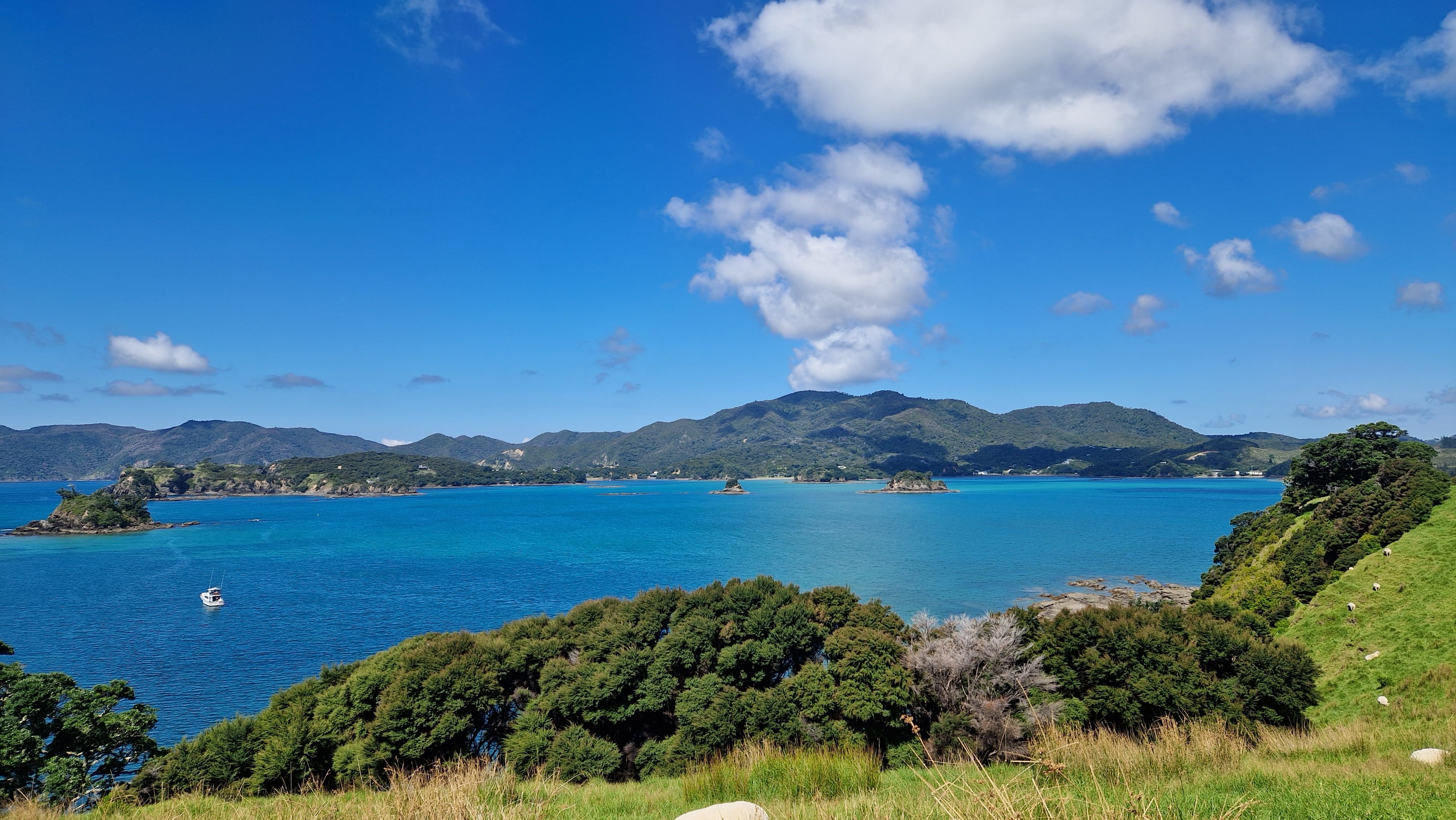
Hat Island (Left, in distance) Mahenotiti Island (Centre) and Te Ao Island (Right) as viewed from Urupukapuka.

Mahenotiti Island is a small island in the Bay of Islands of New Zealand, located about 12 kilometres (7.5 mi) northeast of Russell.
