= Piercy Island (New Zealand) =

Island in New Zealand

Māori: Motu Kōkako Nickname: The Hole In The Rock
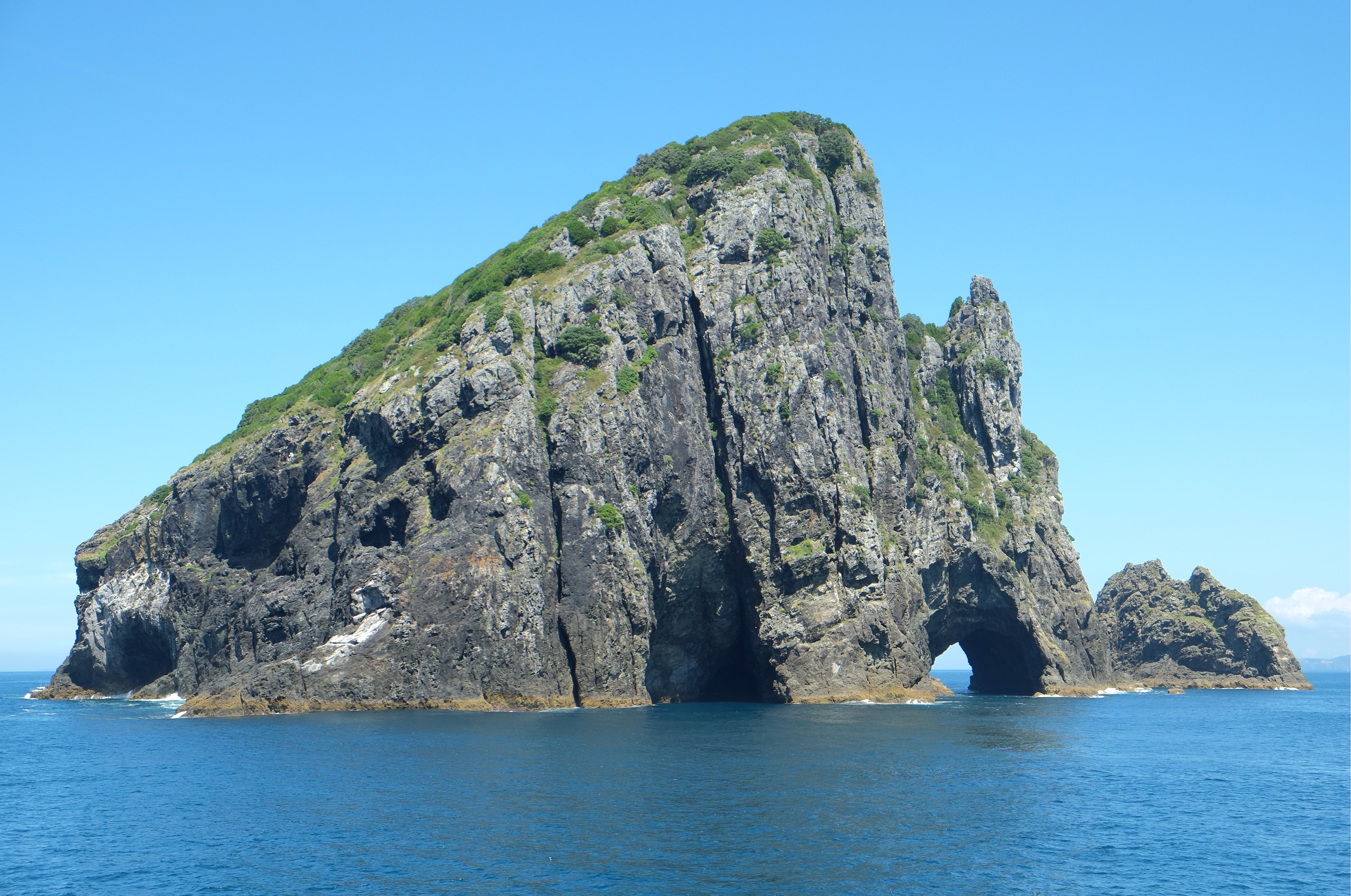
- Interactive map of Piercy Island

Geography
- Location: Northland Region
- Coordinates: 35°10′S 174°20′E

Administration
- New Zealand

Piercy Island, also known as "The Hole In The Rock" (and by its Māori-language name Motu Kōkako), is located off the north coast of the North Island of New Zealand. It is at the very northern tip of Cape Brett in the Bay of Islands. It is Māori freehold land, which is administered by the Motu Kōkako Ahu Whenua Trust for the benefit of the descendants of the traditional owners.

The island is of great cultural significance to the Ngāpuhi iwi (tribe), and was historically associated with a range of sacred customary activities. Motu Kōkako was said to be the landing place of the canoe Tūnui-a-rangi before it went to Ngunguru and Whangarei. It brings to mind the whakataukī (proverb) "Te toka tū moana" ("the rock standing in the sea"). This refers to a person who stands against all adversity, just as a rock resists the power of the sea.

It is probably the most important island in the Bay of Islands in conservation terms, being in near pristine condition, with no evidence of introduced animals. A 1987 survey of the island found 99 different types of flora, and noted the presence of two types of petrels and lizards.

Captain Cook named the island "Piercy Island" in honour of one of the Lords of the Admiralty.

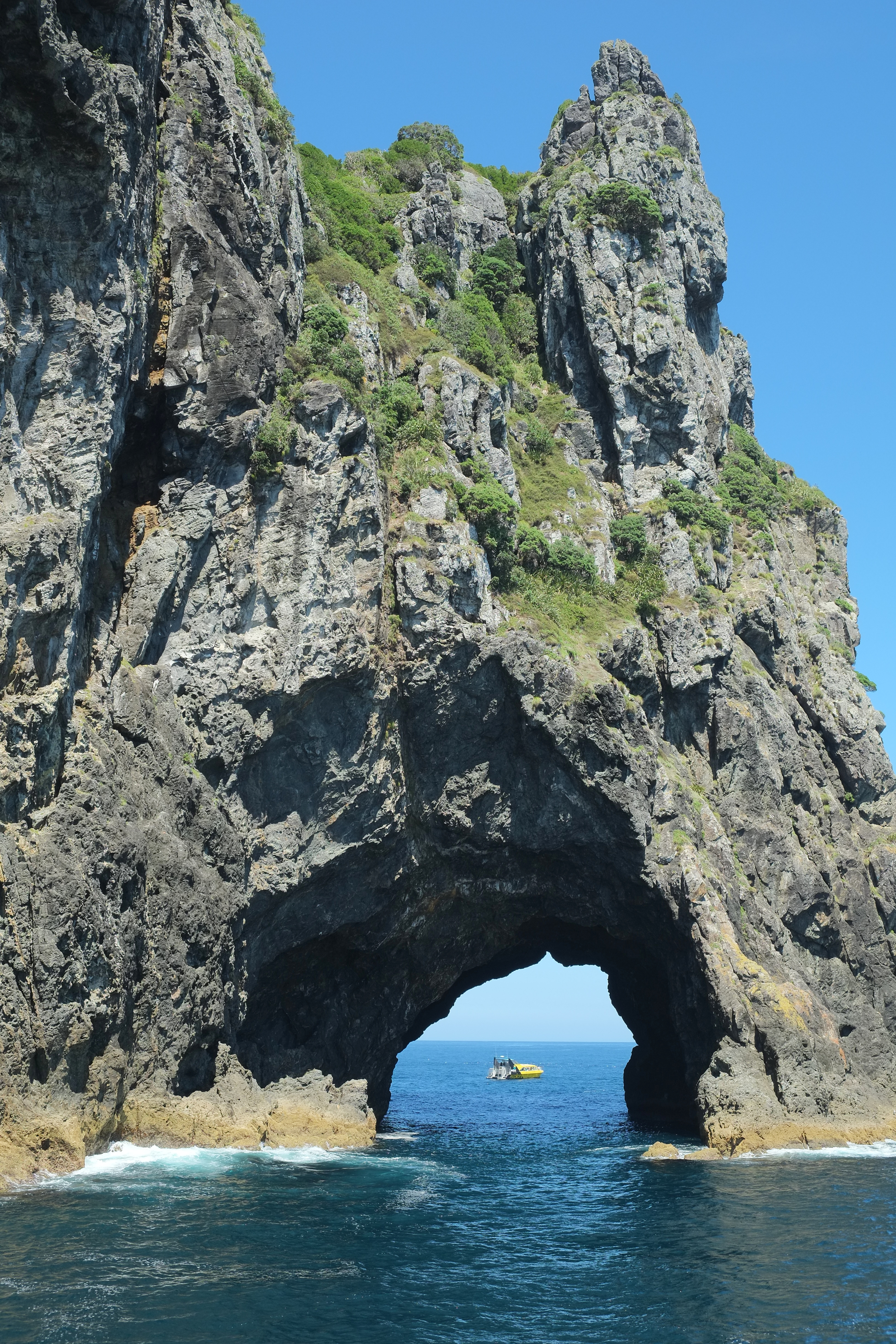
The 'Hole in the Rock', the local tourist attraction

The 60-foot (18 m) hole at sea level was created over centuries by wind and waves making it one of the most naturally beautiful sites in New Zealand. Being a popular tourist destination there are a multitude of tours offered and if the waters are calm and the tide is right the jet boats will go right through the hole. There are also helicopter tours to the island.

The use of the island by tourist boat operators has been the subject of a long running dispute, with tourism companies taking boats through the Hole in the Rock but not paying a share of the takings to the island's owners.

Apart from a short period between 1989 – 1992, the owners of the island have received no royalties from the boat operators. Offers by the operators to work together with Motu Kōkako Ahu Whenua Trust were declined. A Treaty of Waitangi claim (Wai 2022) has been lodged by the Motu Kōkako Ahu Whenua Trust and is currently being considered. There is no dispute between the owners and the helicopter tour operators Salt Air. The Trust and Salt Air have signed a joint tourism venture agreement, under which Salt Air pays a levy for each visitor to the island in recognition of the owners' mana whenua/mana moana rights.

== See also ==
- List of islands of New Zealand
