= Cape Brett Peninsula =

Peninsula in the Bay of Islands, New Zealand

Coordinates: 35.1729°S 174.3310°E

Native name: Rākaumangamanga
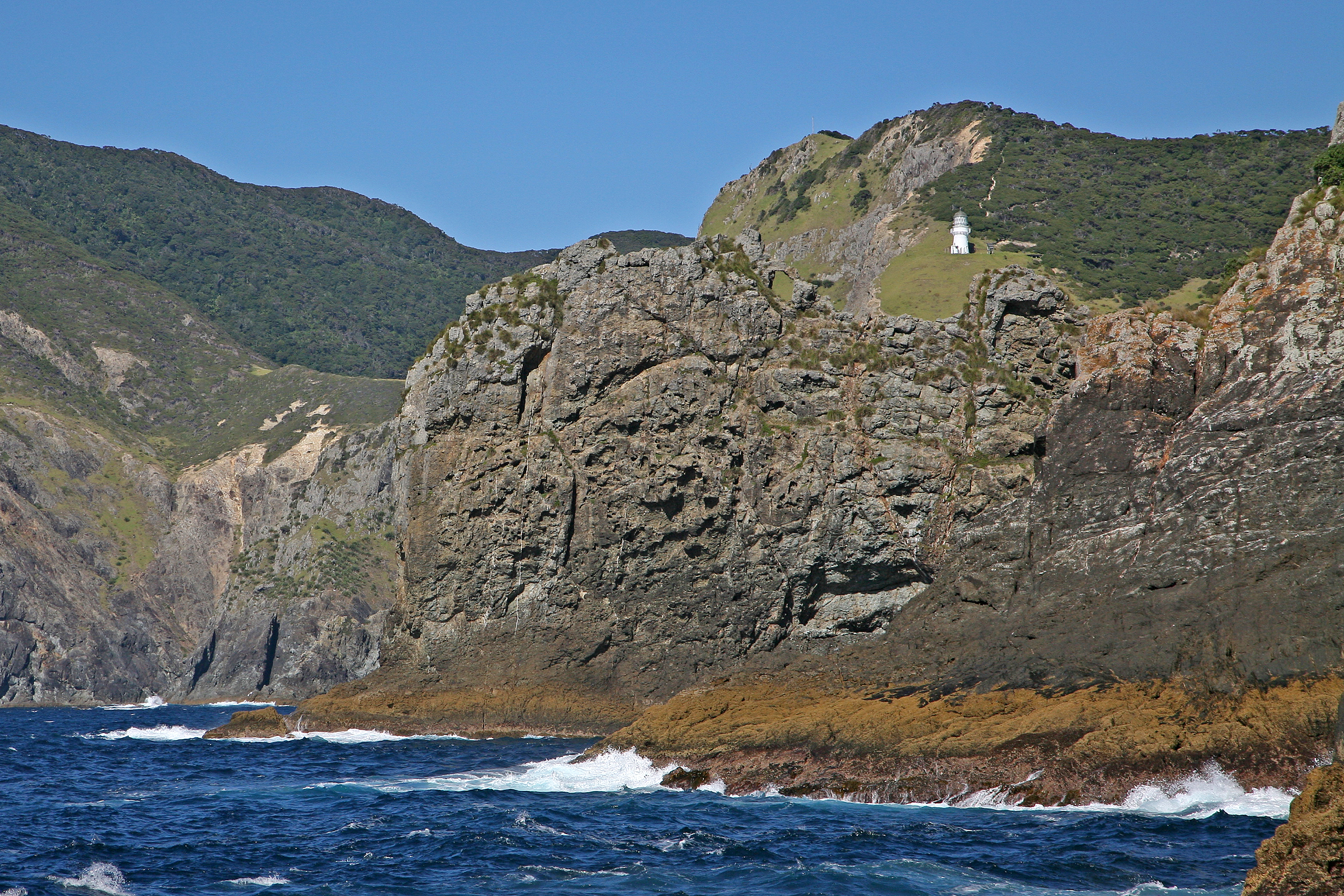
- The Cape Brett Lighthouse
- Interactive map of Cape Brett Peninsula

Cape Brett Peninsula (Māori: Rākaumangamanga) is a 15 km (9.3 mi) long peninsula in the Bay of Islands, in the Northland Region of New Zealand.

== Geography ==
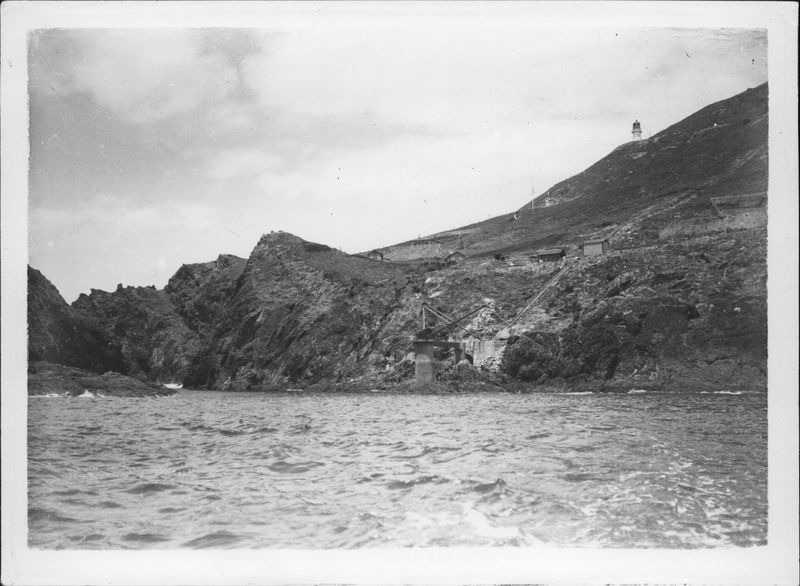
Cape Brett in 1911

The head of the peninsula is Cape Brett itself (also known by the Māori, Rākaumangamanga), a promontory which extends north into the Pacific Ocean at the eastern end of the Bay of Islands. The Rakaumangamanga/Cape Brett Track begins in Rawhiti, at the Opourua Bay (Oke Bay) Scenic Reserve Entrance. There is a water taxi service from Hauai Bay (start of the track in Rawhiti) to Maunganui Bay (Deep Water Cove) for hikers to do the track one way.

Cape Brett Lighthouse stands at the end of the peninsula, which rises to 360 metres at its northern end. A noted landmark, the natural arch "Hole in the Rock" of Piercy Island lies about 500 metres off the cape.

A predator proof fence across the peninsula excludes the brushtail possum, an introduced animal pest, which feeds on the pōhutukawa tree to such an extent that the tree can eventually die.

The peninsula includes Opourua/Oke Bay, off Rawhiti Road, about 29 km from Russell.

== Whangamumu ==
Whangamumu Harbour and Peninsula are near the south east end of the Cape Brett Peninsula. There are remnants of a whaling station, which was at Whangamumu from about 1844, until the sinking of Niagara in 1940 caused an oil slick, which moved whales away from the area.

A 4.2 km (2.6 mi) walking track runs from the Tangatapu wetlands over a ridge with regenerating coastal forest to a sandy beach at the head of the harbour, near the whaling station.

Te Toroa Track, which linked to the Cape Brett track, has been closed since 2021, due to concerns about kauri dieback.

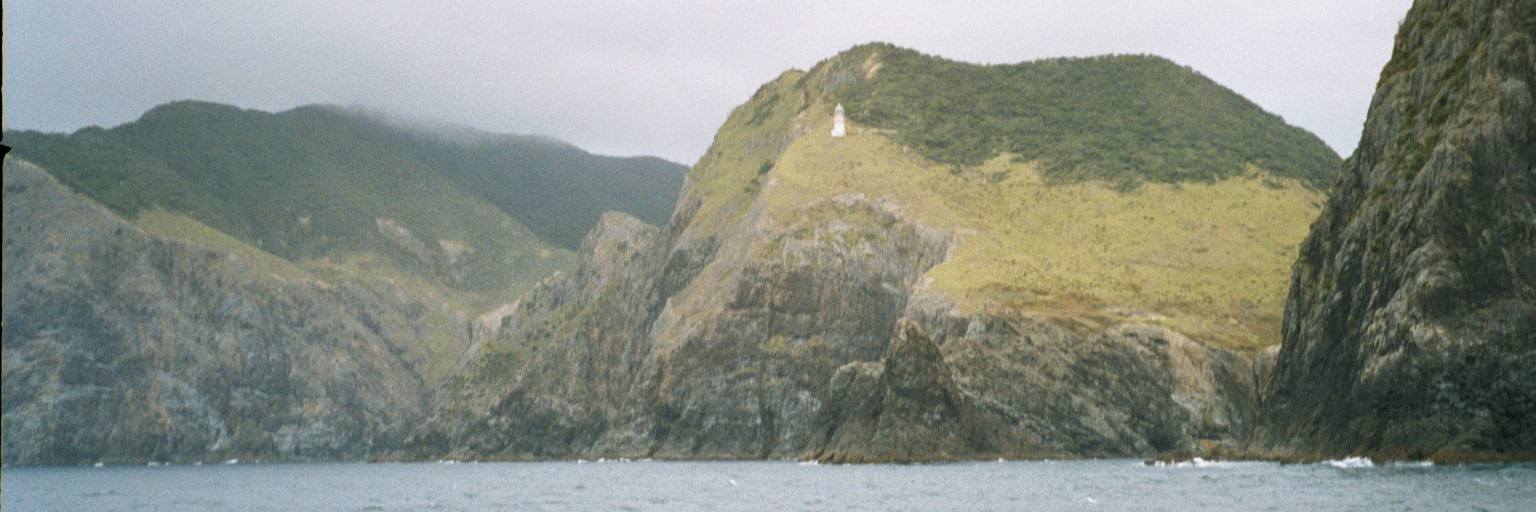
Cape Brett from the water

== Demographics ==
Demographics for Cape Brett Peninsula are covered at Rawhiti#Demographics.
