= Urupukapuka Island =

Island in New Zealand

- Location within New Zealand

Geography
- Location: Bay of Islands
- Coordinates: 35°13′0″S 174°14′0″E
- Area: 2.08 km^{2} (0.80 sq mi)
- Highest elevation: 106 m (348 ft)

Administration
- New Zealand

Demographics
- Population: 0 permanent residents

Urupukapuka Island is the largest island in the Bay of Islands of New Zealand, located about 7.3 km (4.5 mi) from Paihia. The island is a popular stopover point for tour boats to the Hole in the Rock and is also serviced by ferries for day trips from Paihia and Russell. Urupukapuka is commonly interpreted as the island of many puka trees due to the amount of puka trees that used to be on the island. Now, there are only a few puka trees left on the island due to deforestation.

== History ==
Urupukapuka Island was previously settled by the Ngare Raumati tribe, one of the oldest tribes of the area. In 1839, William Brind, a whaling captain, claimed to have purchased 150 acres of Urupukapuka from Rewa, a chief of the Ngāpuhi tribe, for one mare valued at 45 English pounds. The claim was invalidated when Rewa claimed that the mare represented a mere deposit and not the whole lump sum amount. In the later 1800s, two Europeans leased some of the land on Urupukapuka for grazing and began to clear the island and build a fence line.

In 1927, Otehei Bay had become the base of the fishing expeditions of the American author Zane Grey, and a world-famous fishing resort was later established there.

== Geography ==
The island is 208 hectares (514 acres) in size. There are many sandy beaches. The waters around the island are clear and diving is particularly good on the east coast where there is plentiful reef life. Indico and Paradise Bays are popular sheltered anchorages and ideal for most forms of water sports. The archeological features of Urupukapuka are interesting because of their range, the diversity of sites, and their good state of preservation. An archeological walk with on-site signs interprets many of the pre-European sites on the island. Urupukapuka is ideal for "back to nature" camping. The informal camping is made possible by combining farming with recreation.

== Ecology ==
The bays are inhabited by a colony of shags, and pōhutukawa are abundant along the coastline. The New Zealand dotterel, oystercatcher, pied stilt and paradise duck breed on the island. Because of previous deforestation, there are only a few puka trees left on the island, compared to the hundreds that used to cover the whole island before Europeans arrived.

== Restoration ==
Project Island Song has helped with the restoration of native trees to the island significantly. They have made the island pest-free, and have released 12 brown teal ducks onto the island because its numbers have dwindled to only around 2000 left in the wild.

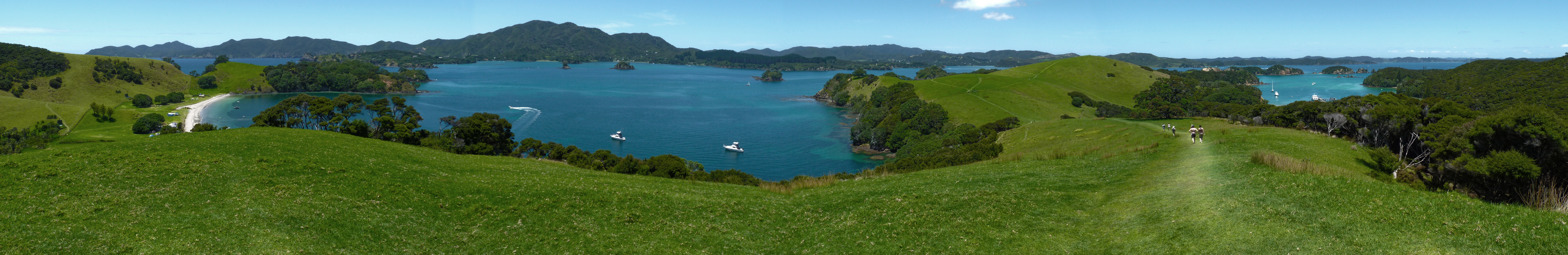
Panorama from a lookout point on Urupukapuka Island
