= Moturua Island =

Small island in New Zealand

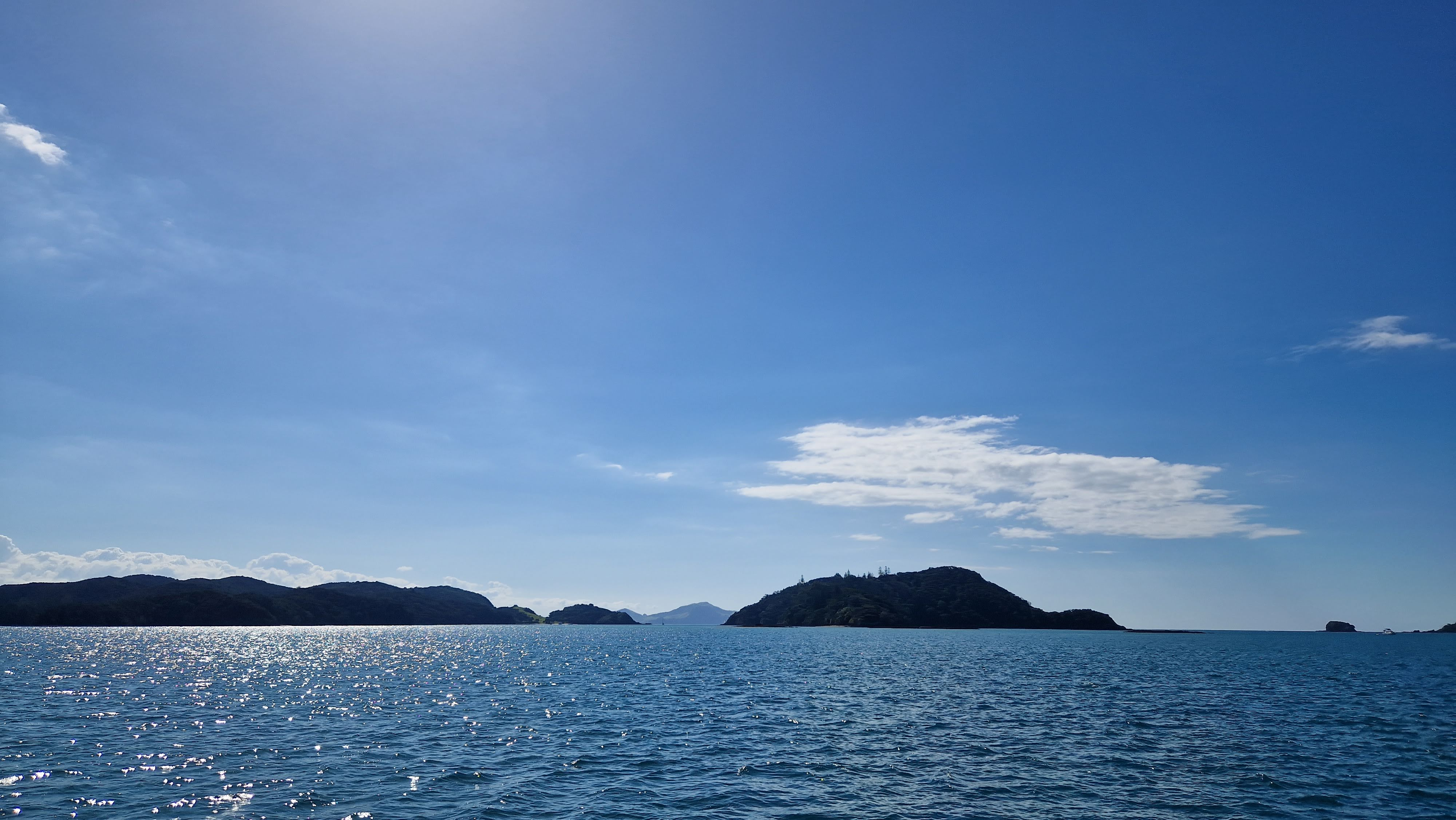
- Moturua Island (Left) viewed from the south.

- Location within Northland Region

Geography
- Location: Bay of Islands
- Coordinates: 35°13′0″S 174°11′0″E
- Area: 1.36 km^{2} (0.53 sq mi)
- Length: 1.89 km (1.174 mi)
- Width: 1.92 km (1.193 mi)
- Highest elevation: 99 m (325 ft)

Administration
- New Zealand

Moturua Island, location within the Bay Of Islands, Northland Region, New Zealand
Moturua Island, Bay Of Islands, Northland NZ

Moturua Island is a small island in the Bay of Islands of New Zealand, located about 7 kilometres (4.3 mi) northeast of Russell.

== Etymology ==
The Māori name Moturua translates to Island Number Two or Second Island in English, with "Motu" meaning "island" or "to stand alone against the elements," and "Rua" signifying the number two.

== History ==
The island has 27 documented archaeological sites. These include headland pā (Hikurangi Pā, Haikai Pā & Paeroa Pā), food refuse middens, garden areas, terraces, and storage pits. The abundance of these remains suggests that early Māori communities lived here.

Notably, an ancient midden containing moa bone has been found.

Captain Cook anchored off Moturua in 1769. French explorer Marion Du Fresne and his crew set up temporary camp on the island in 1772 which lasted for three months.

In World War II, the Royal New Zealand Navy operated a mine control station in Army Bay of Moturua.

== Geography ==
The Islands bays include Waiwhapuku Bay, Otupoho Bay, Awaawaroa Bay, Hahangarua Bay, Waipao Bay, Waiti Bay, Wairake Bay & Mangahawea Bay.

Moturua Island has a relict population of North Island robin (Petroica longipes).
