= Otepatotu Scenic Reserve =

Conservation reserve on Banks Peninsula, New Zealand

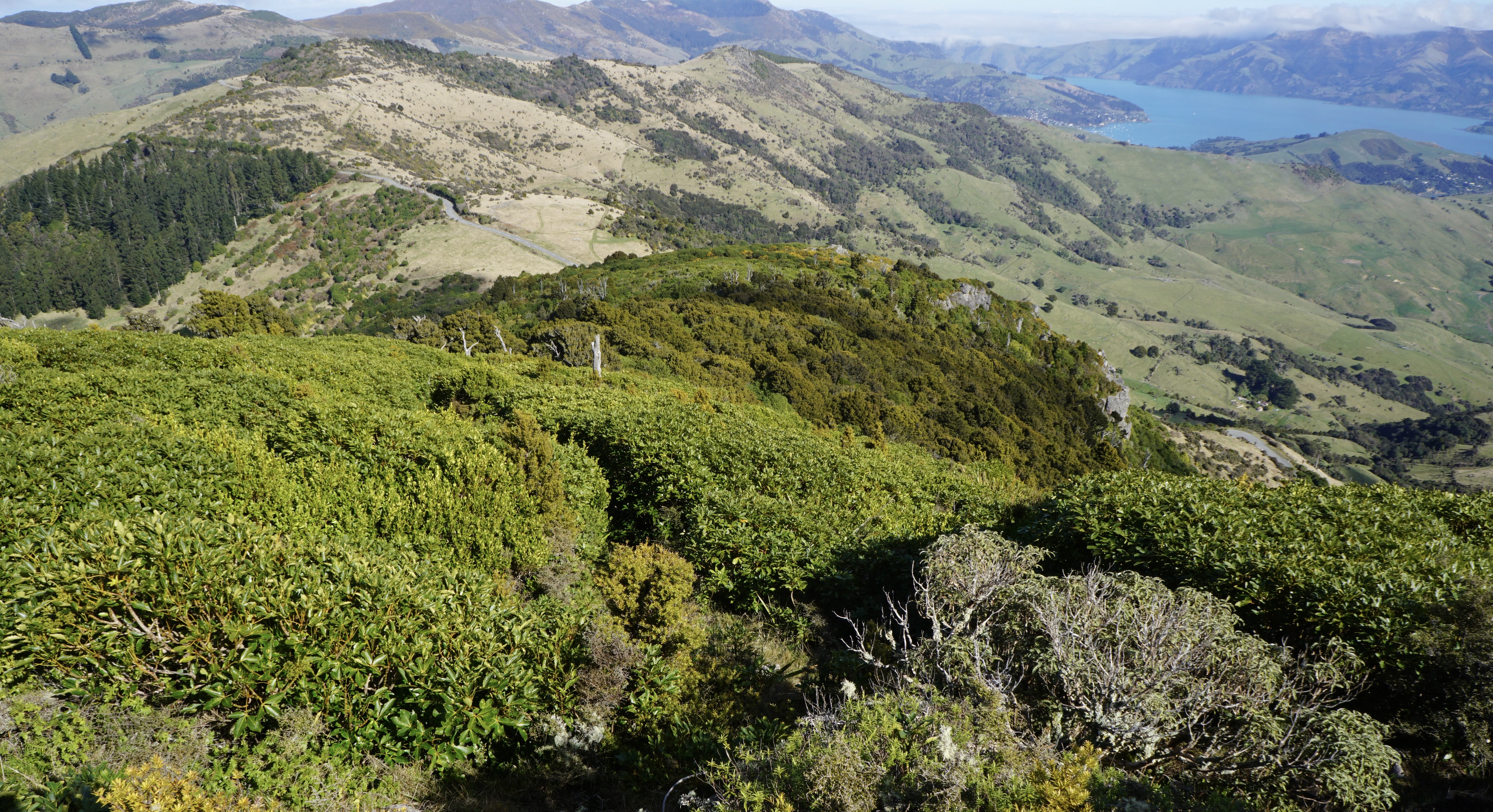

- Location within Banks Peninsula
- Location: Banks Peninsula
- Nearest city: Christchurch
- Coordinates: 43°44′56″S 173°01′01″E
- Area: 39.9 hectares (99 acres)
- Elevation: 600 m (1,968.50 ft)
- Created: 1980
- Etymology: From the Māori Ōtepātotu meaning "place of fairies".
- Operator: Department of Conservation (New Zealand)
- Designation: Scenic Reserve

Otepatotu Scenic Reserve is a public scenic reserve on Banks Peninsula, New Zealand, between Akaroa and Le Bons Bay. It has a stand of regenerating mountain tōtara (Podocarpus laetus) considered to be one of the finest remaining on Banks Peninsula.

== Geography ==
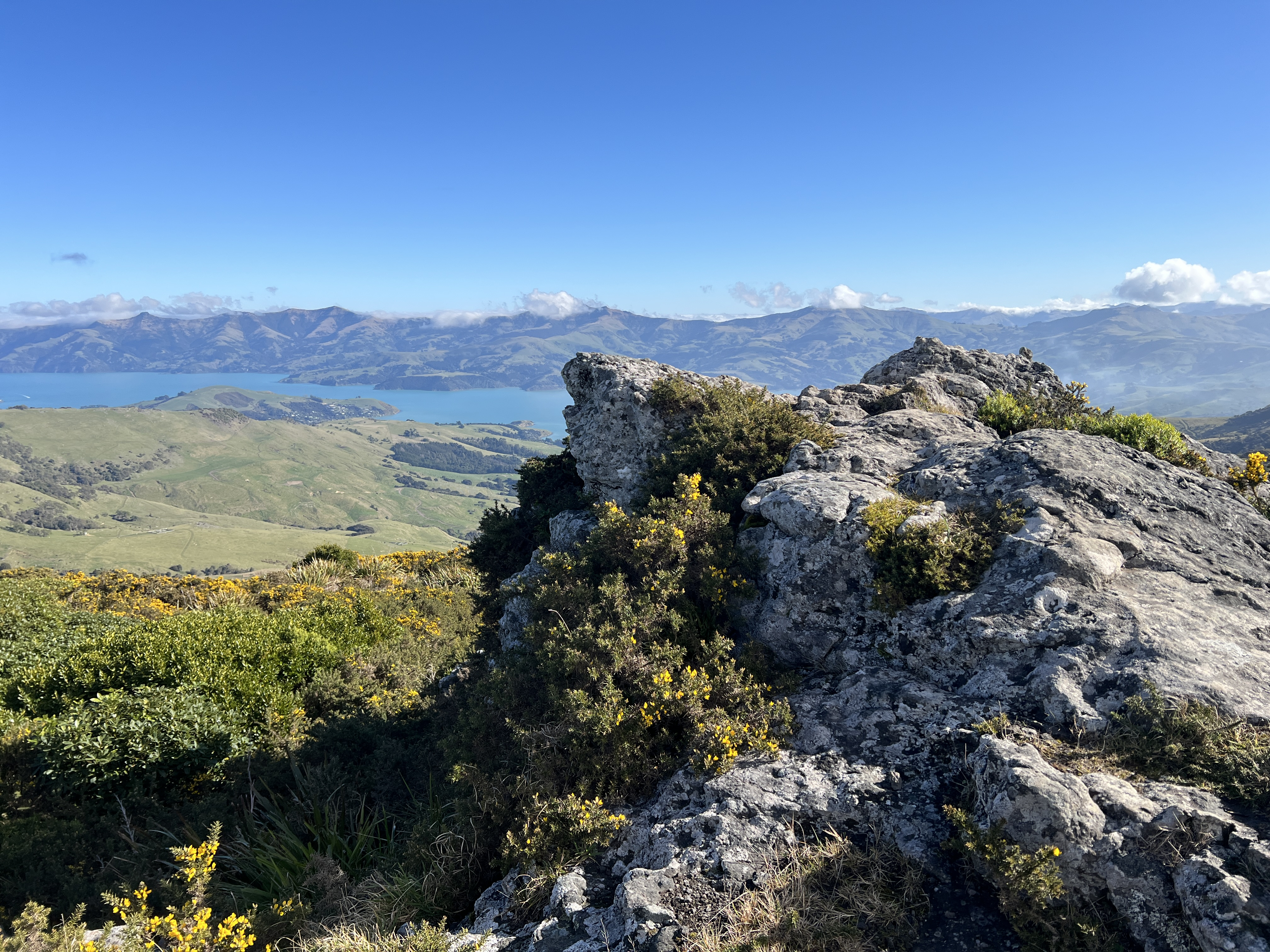
Lookout over Akaroa Harbour

This 39.7-hectare (98-acre) reserve is situated in eastern Banks Peninsula, next to the Summit Road, 14 kilometres (8.7 mi) from Akaroa. The car park at the base of the reserve is approximately 550 metres (1,800 ft) above sea level, and a loop track climbs steeply to Lavericks Peak, 755 metres (0.469 mi) high. A spur leads to a rocky outcrop lookout with a view over Akaroa Harbour. A flat area below Lavericks Peak is bordered by vertical basalt cliffs. The reserve's soil is a combination of loess and granular loam derived from volcanic bedrock.

The reserve is in the Akaroa Ecological District, and is mostly south-facing, receiving high levels of southerly rain and occasional snow, and being sheltered from the dry prevailing nor'wester. Additional moisture comes from year-round cloud around the peaks of the Akaroa crater.

== History ==
The Māori name for the area, Ōtepātotu, translates roughly as "place of the fairies". Māori tradition held that the peak was the home both of maero (wild men) and patupaiarehe (light-skinned fairy folk). Tītī (muttonbirds) once nested near the peak but were exterminated by the patupaiarehe. The name Laverick may refer to a Captain Laverick of the schooner Look In who supplied whaling stations in the 1840s. The name "Otepatotu" has been commonly used to refer to both the peak and the land as far down as what is now known as Lavericks Bay.

In 1930, 37 acres (15 ha) of land beside Lavericks Peak was set aside as Otepatotu Scenic Reserve and the area was fenced and gorse cleared. In 1980 this was joined by 22.7 hectares (56 acres) of neighbouring land, and a small 2.2-hectare (5.4-acre) reserve at Tysons Knob 2 miles (3.2 km) back along the Summit Road. (Note: The Scenic Reserve's official name as of 2025 remains "Otepatotu", though the spellings "Ōtepatotu" and "Ōtepātotu" can also be found in recent reliable sources.) The two main blocks of the reserve were separated by a grassed road, formerly a stock-droving track connecting the Summit Road with Lavericks Ridge.

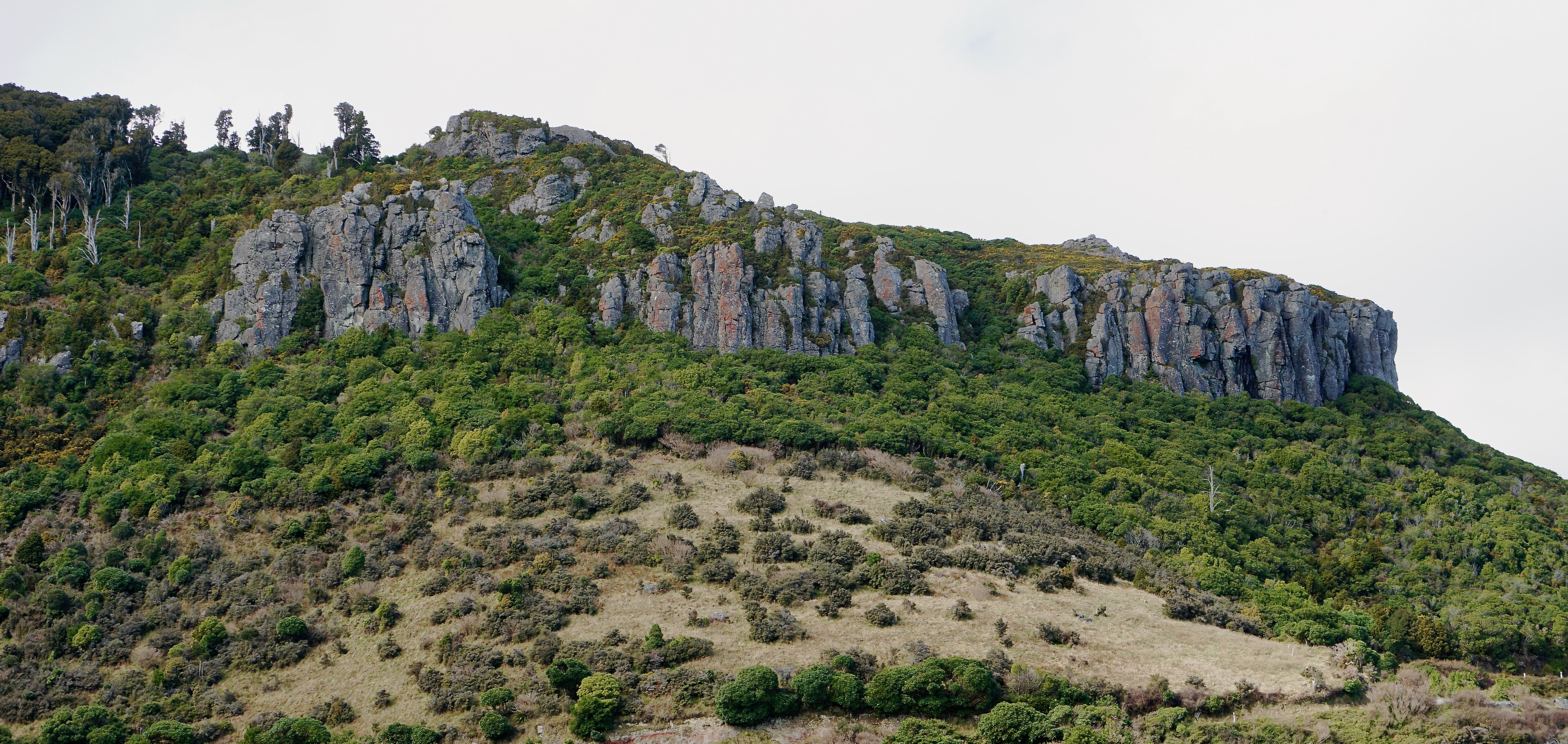
The cliffs at Oteapatotu

In 1973 the cliffs at Otepatotu were first visited by recreational rock climbers, and Tim Wethey was given permission to publish a guide to the "fine and unique climbing" at the site. By the 1980s a collection of routes were in common use on each of the three main buttresses, which were valued for their compact, knobby rock. After the 2011 Christchurch earthquake Otepatotu became a popular climbing destination because it was easily accessible and had escaped damage, unlike many sites in the Port Hills, and many new climbing routes were established; over 100 now exist on the three buttresses and main cliff wall.

== Ecology ==
=== Flora ===
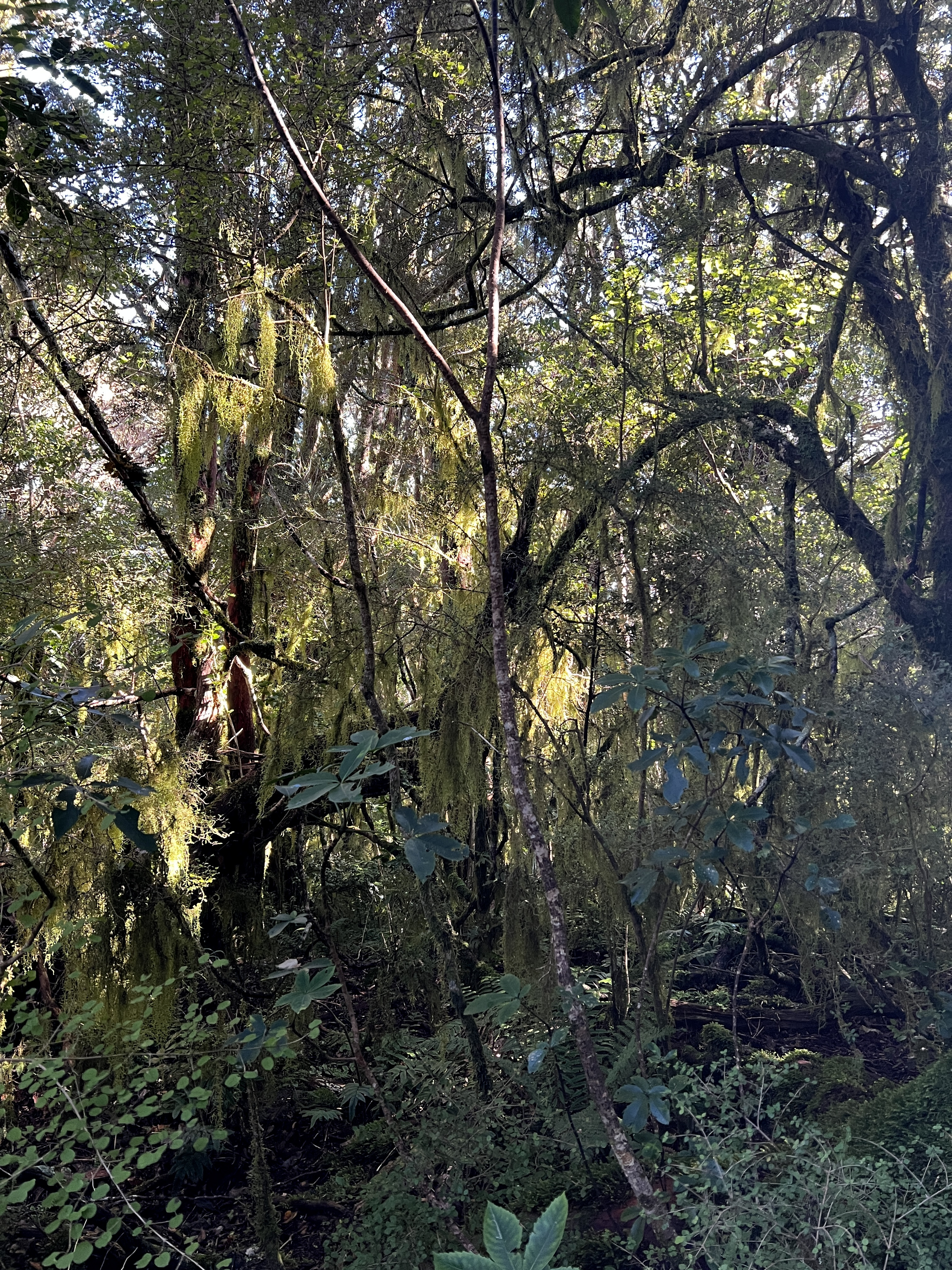
Forest interior

Otepatotu is notable primarily for its remnant of old-growth mountain tōtara (Podocarpus laetus) forest, which is considered one of the finest remaining on Banks Peninsula. The trees are festooned with lichens (Usnea sp.) and hanging goblin moss (Weymouthia sp.), which gives it the appearance of a "goblin forest". Second-growth forest trees include tree fuchsia / kotukutuku (Fuchsia excorticata), broadleaf / kāpuka (Griselinia littoralis), māhoe (Melicytus ramiflorus), and abundant mountain five-finger (Pseudopanax colensoi). Tōtara and other forest trees continue to regenerate at the reserve edges.

The reserve has a large number of species that are uncommon, rare, or very localised on Banks Peninsula, including the clubmoss Phlegmariurus varius, the mountain holly Olearia ilicifolia, climbing groundsel (Brachyglottis sciadophila), and a notable population of tōī / mountain cabbage tree (Cordyline indivisa), one of the highest concentrations on the Peninsula. The open shrubland outside the forest contains the endemic Banks Peninsula hebe Veronica strictissima, which is classified as At Risk - Naturally Uncommon, as well as mountain flax / wharariki (Phormium colensoi) and old tōtara logs.

=== Fauna ===
Riflemen / titipounamu (Acanthisitta chloris), otherwise uncommon in the Akaroa ecological district, have been recorded at Otepatotu. Brown creeper / Pīpipi (Mohoua novaeseelandiae), South Island tomtit (Petroica macrocephala), bellbird / korimako (Anthornis melanura), and kererū (Hemiphaga novaeseelandiae) are also present.

The endemic Banks Peninsula carabid Mecodema howittii and tree wētā Hemideina ricta, both classed as At Risk, occur here, as well as the uncommon six-eyed spider Periegops suterii and an undescribed species of Holcaspis carabid beetle endemic to Banks Peninsula.

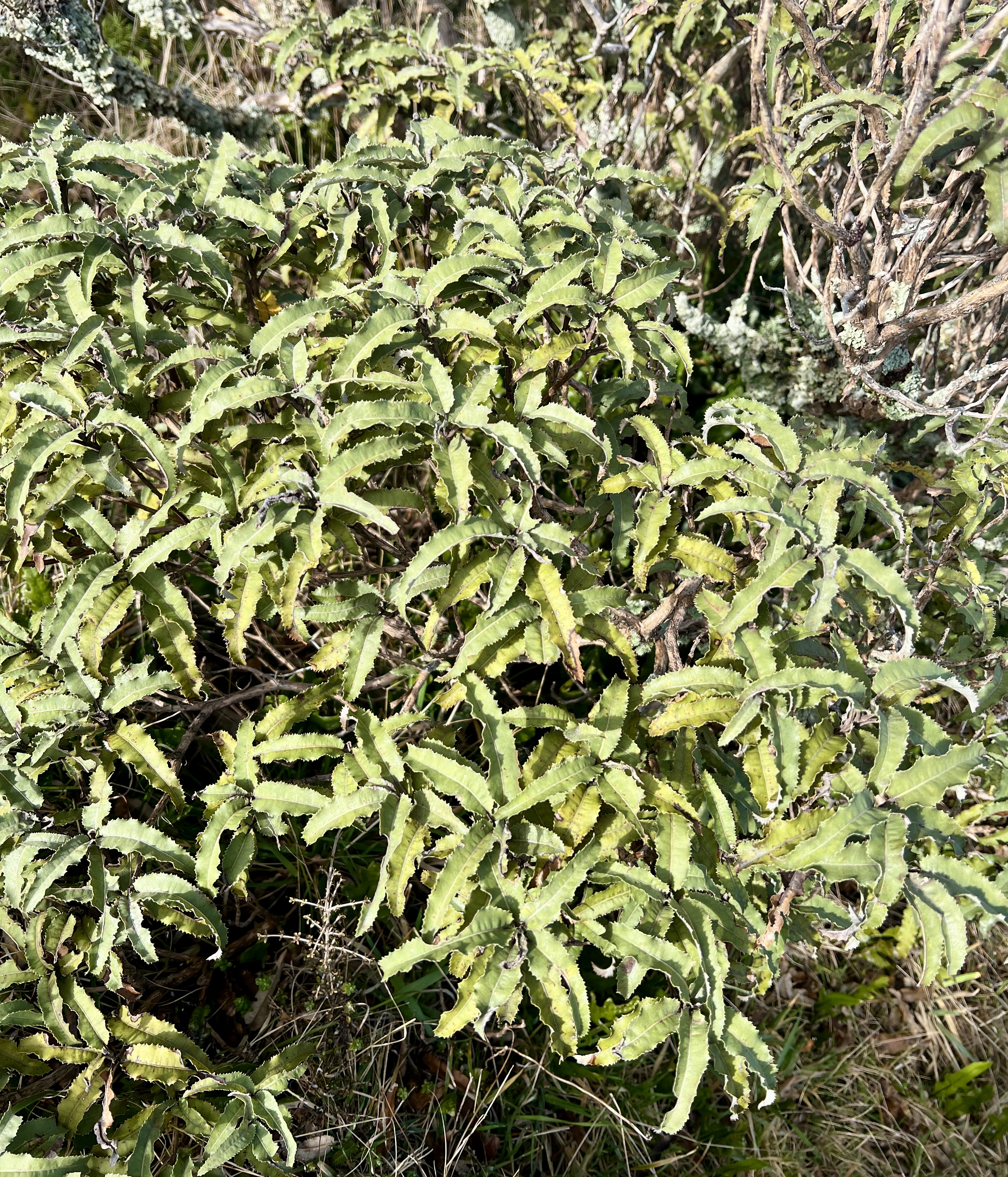
Olearia ilicifolia

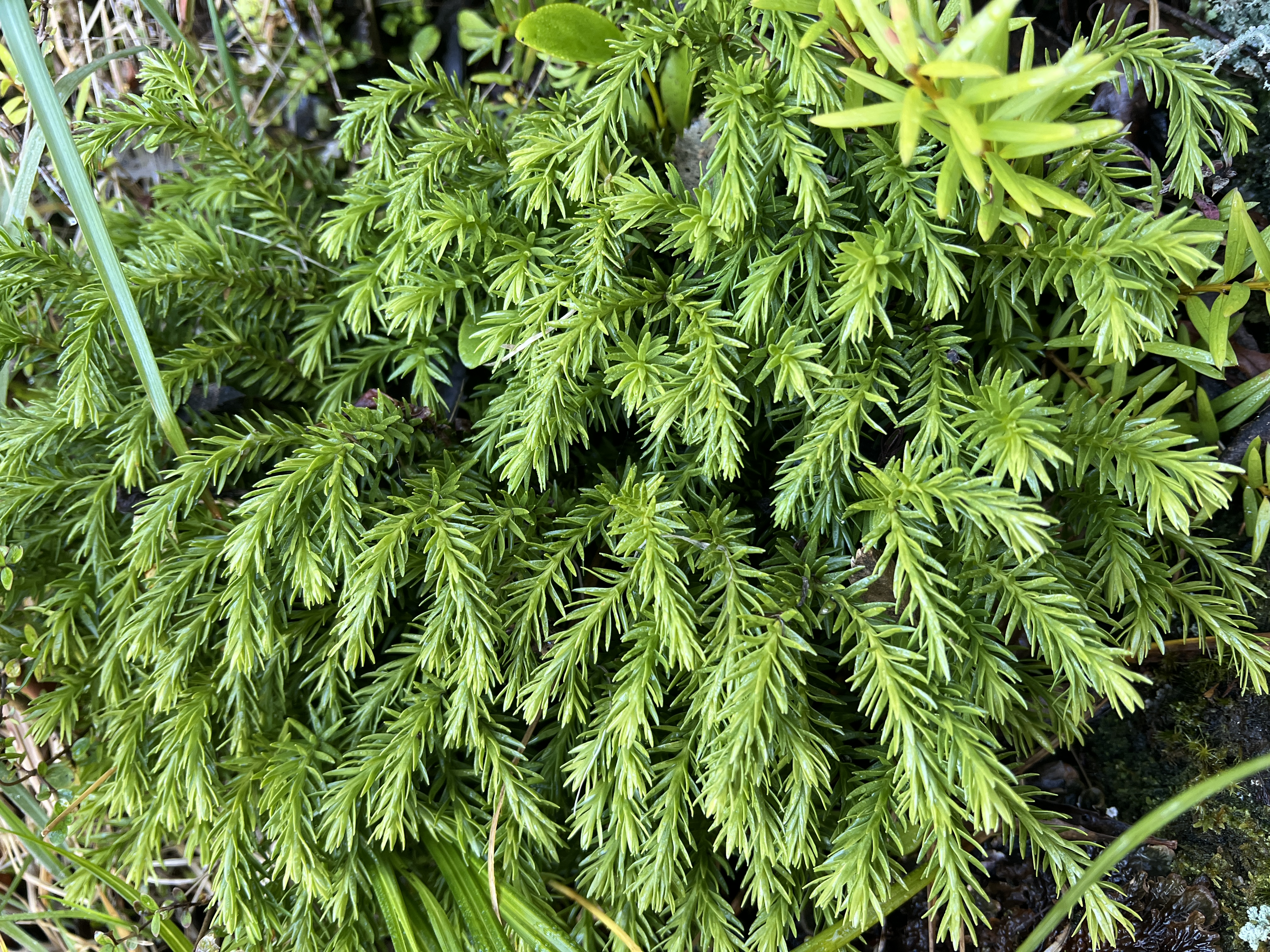
Phlegmariurus varius

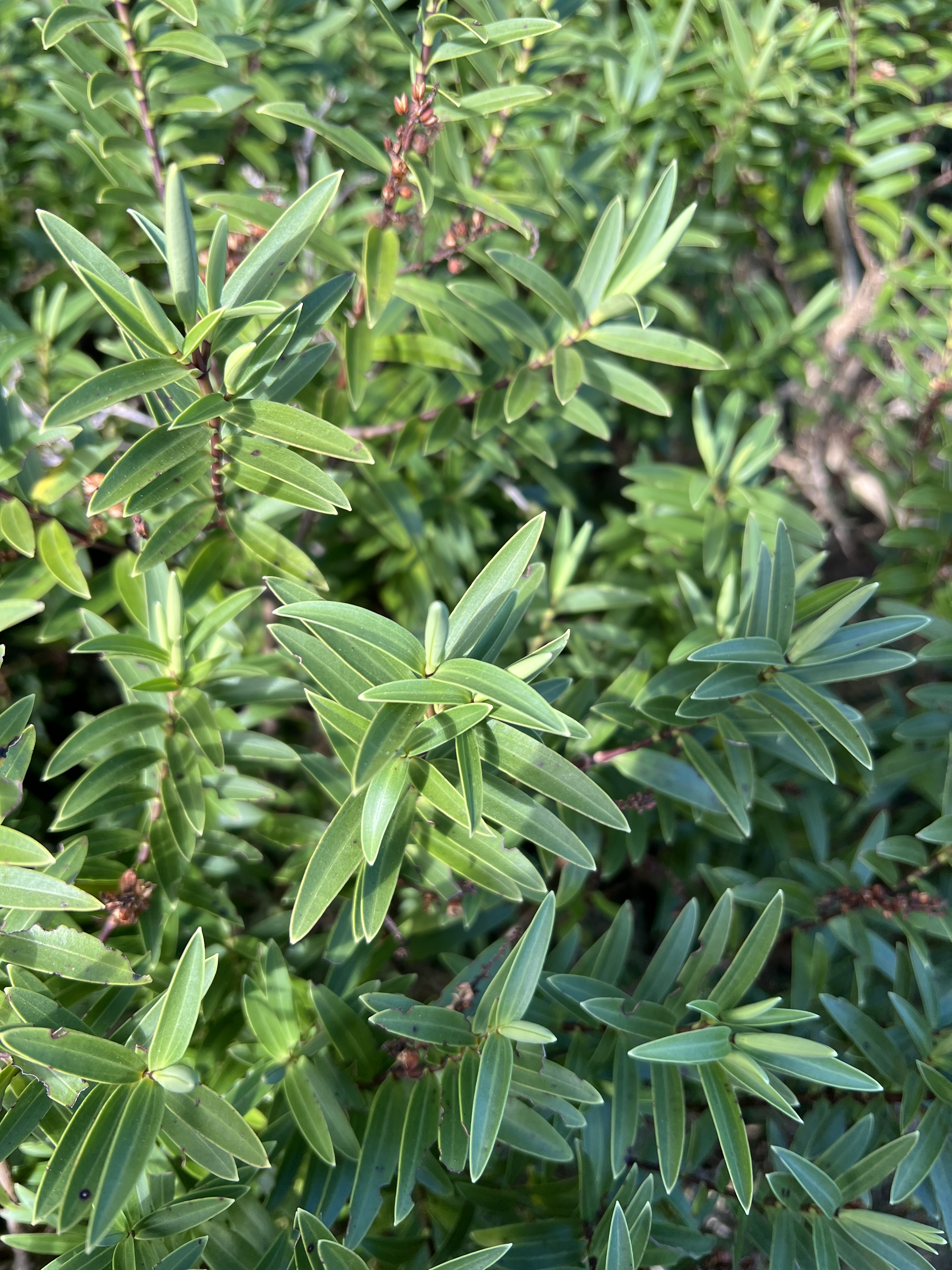
Veronica strictissima

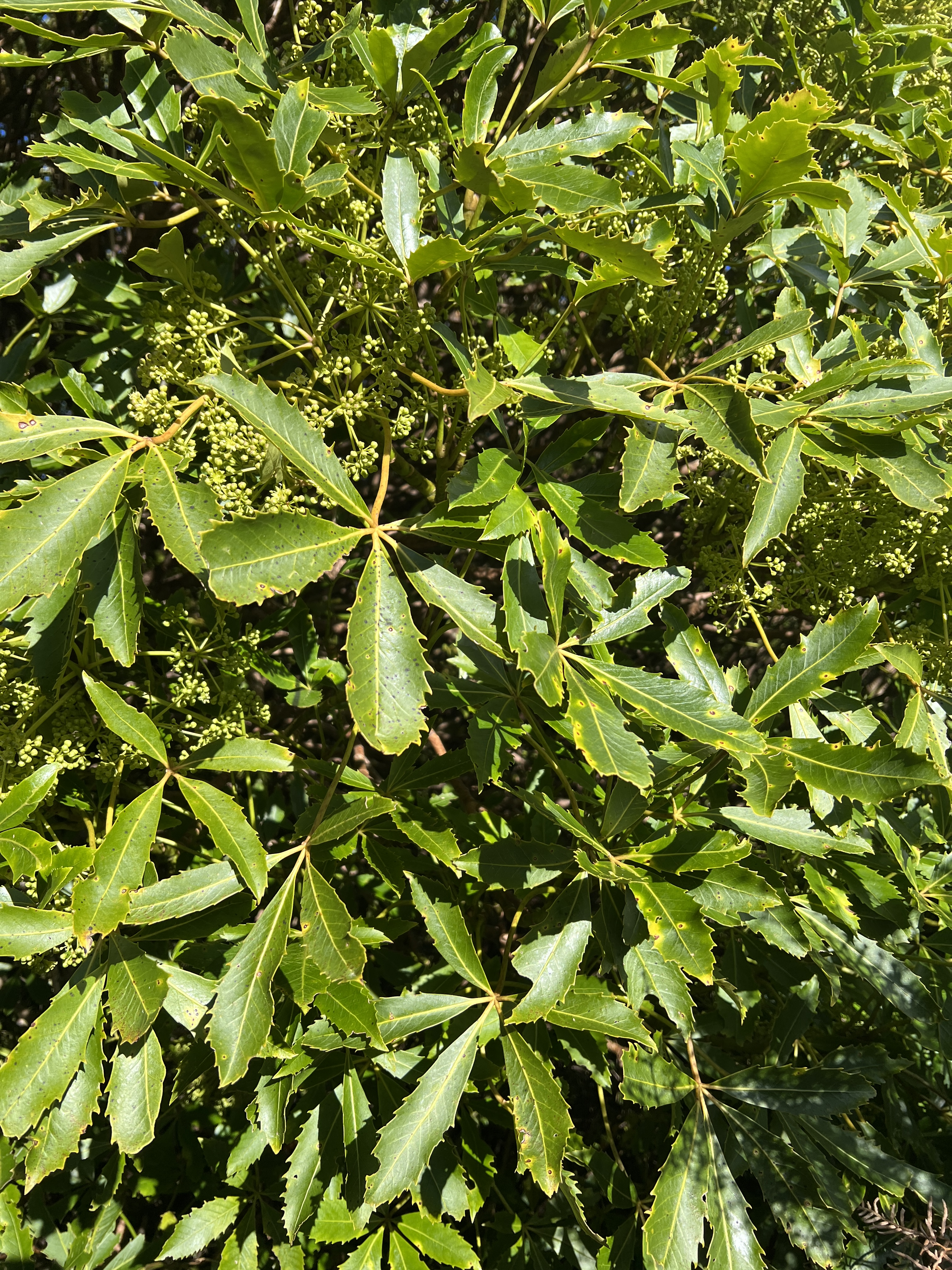
Pseudopanax colensoi

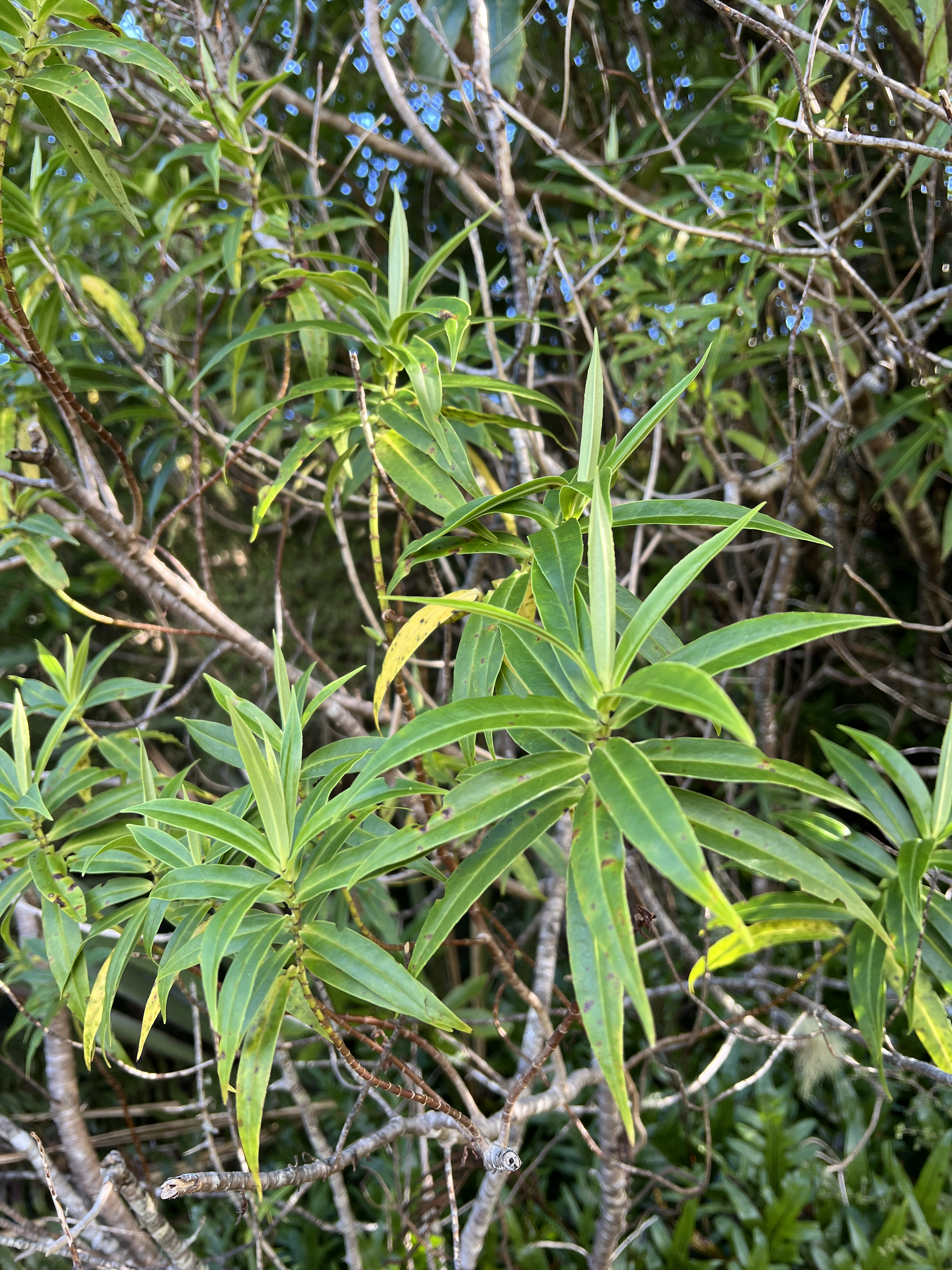
Veronica salicifolia

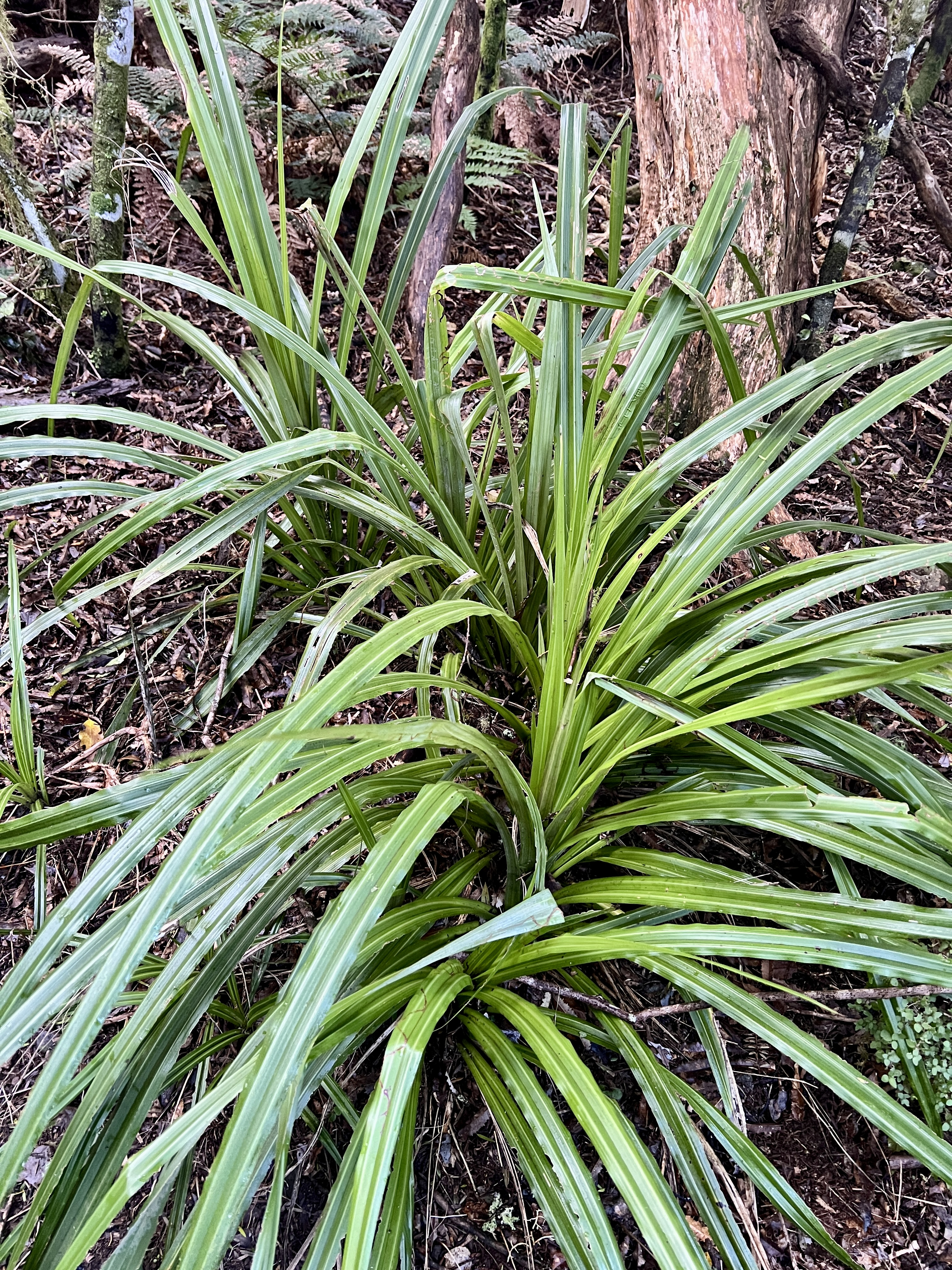
Astelia fragrans

== See also ==
- Conservation in New Zealand
- Banks Peninsula
