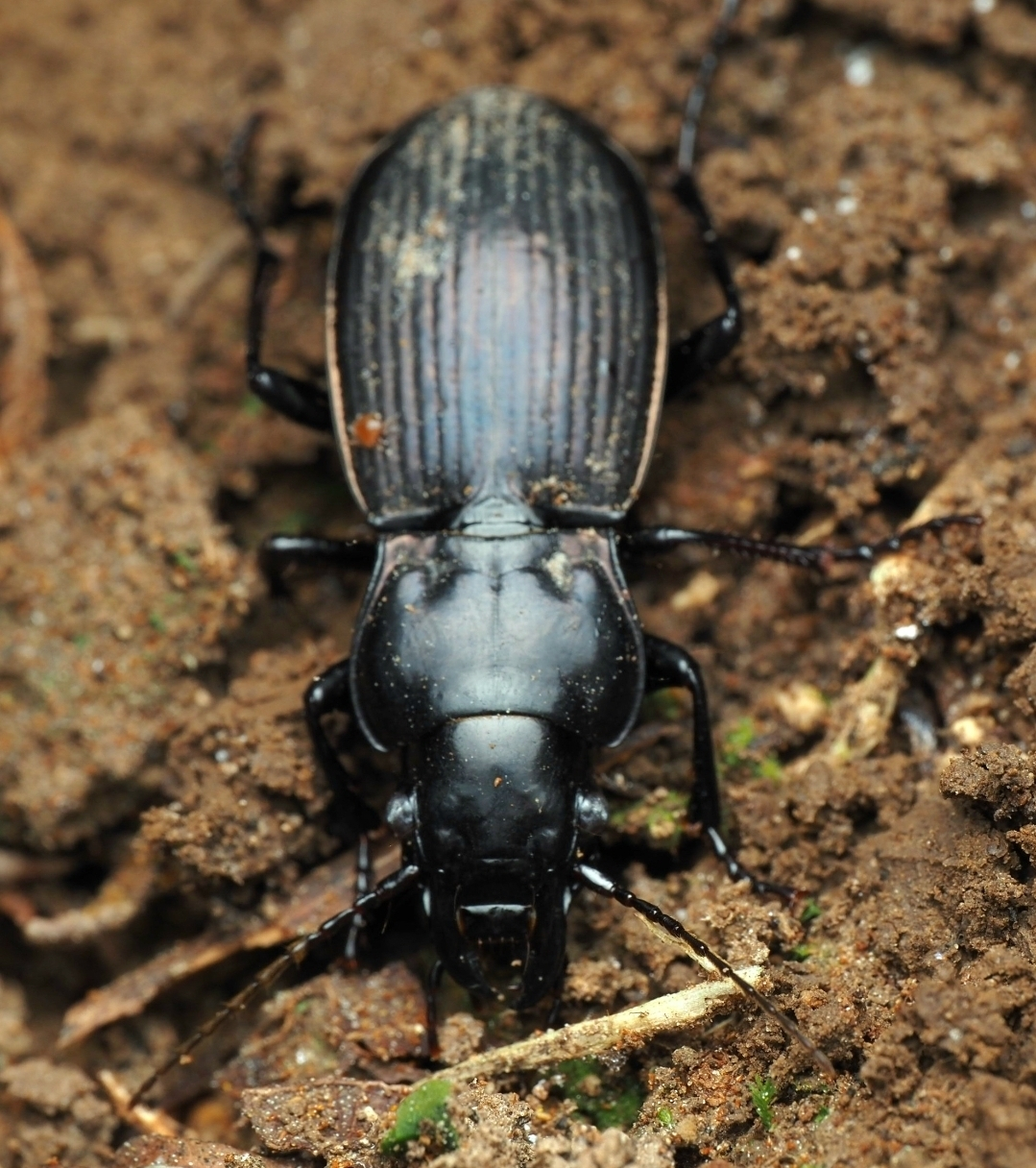

Scientific classification
- Kingdom: Animalia
- Phylum: Arthropoda
- Class: Insecta
- Order: Coleoptera
- Suborder: Adephaga
- Family: Carabidae
- Genus: Megadromus
- Species: M. guerinii

Binomial name
- Megadromus guerinii (Chaudoir, 1865)

Synonyms
- Synonymy: Feronia australasiae Guérin-Méneville, 1841; Abax australasiae Blanchard, 1853; Feronia guerinii Chaudoir, 1865; Homalosoma australasiae Gemminger & Harold, 1868; Trichosternus guerinii Broun, 1880; Trichosternus australasiae Tschitschérine, 1902; Trichosternus akaroensis Broun, 1903; Megadromus australasiae Britton, 1940

= Megadromus guerinii =

Species of beetle

Megadromus guerinii is a species of ground beetle endemic to New Zealand. It was originally described in 1841, although the name given later recognised to be the same as another species, and it was redescribed again in 1865. This moderately sized black beetle is only found on Banks Peninsula, where it is common, occurring in forests, shrublands and human-modified habitat underneath rocks or logs. In 2004, it was successfully introduced to the Ōtamahua / Quail Island reserve in Lyttelton Harbour. It is nocturnal and most active during the breeding season in spring and summer. Genetic studies indicate that there is a split between western and eastern populations of the species, perhaps due to geographical separation.

== Taxonomy ==
This species was originally described in 1841 by the French entomologist Félix Édouard Guérin-Méneville as Feronia australasiae from specimens collected by a French expedition in New Zealand. However in 1865 Maximilien Chaudoir (a Russian coleopterist) recognised this to be a homonym of a different species, so he renamed it to Feronia guerinii. The specific epithet refers to Guérin-Méneville. The species has undergone numerous revisions over the years, being placed in the genera Abax, Homalosoma, and Trichosternus, finally being moved to the genus Megadromus in 1940 by the British coleopterist Everard Britton. Britton referred to it as Megadromus australasiae, overlooking Chaudoir's replacement of the name in 1865; this was rectified in 2001, where it was recognised that it should be called Megadromus guerinii.

== Description ==
As adults, the beetles are 20–24 millimetres (0.8–0.9 in) in length. The overall colour of the body is black. The pronotum (the first upper segment of the thorax) is around 11 millimetres (0.43 in) wide and 7.5 millimetres (0.30 in) long, with setiferous punctures (depressions with bristles in them) on either side. The prosternum (the first lower segment of the thorax) has bristles at its extremity. The elytra (modified and hardened wings that cover the abdomen) are more depressed when compared to other Megadromus, and the middle and base of the elytra are more shiny than the margins and end, which are somewhat dull.

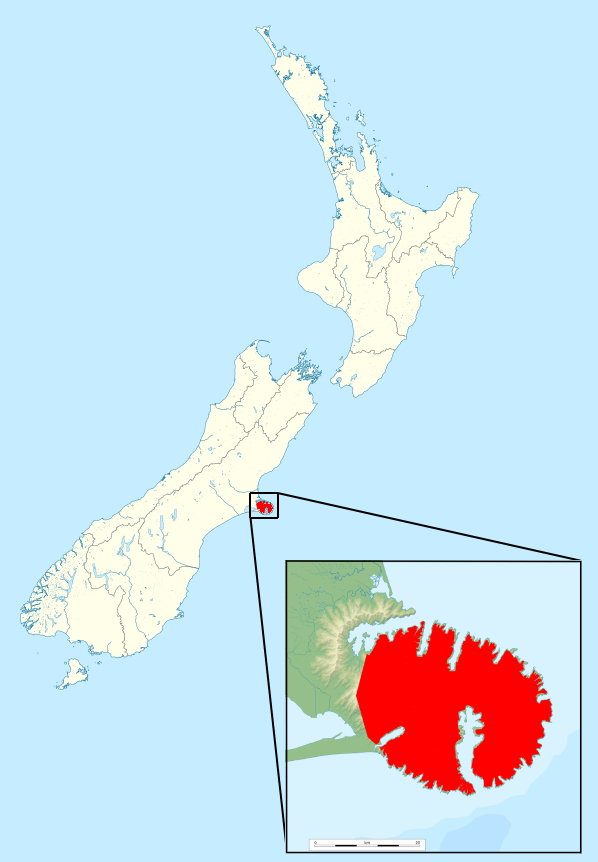
Distribution of Megadromus guerinii within New Zealand.

== Distribution and habitat ==
This species is endemic to New Zealand and is only found in central and eastern Banks Peninsula in the Canterbury region of the South Island. The peninsula is known to be a biodiversity hotspot with high levels of endemism. Although Guérin claimed specimens had been collected in "Port Otago" (Dunedin) and the Bay of Islands, and Britton reported specimens from South Canterbury and Otago, these were determined to be either misidentified or incorrectly labelled.

In 2004, fifty four specimens of Megadromus guerinii were released onto Quail Island in Lyttelton Harbour as part of ecological restoration efforts on the island. The beetles went undetected until 2018, when several were found during routine monitoring, indicating they had successfully established.

M. guerinii occurs in lowland dry forests, shrublands, and human-modified habitat such as pastures and gardens, where individuals shelter under rocks or logs, although it is not a burrowing species. It is associated with stonier topsoil and flat ground. It is the most common and widespread carabid (ground beetle) found across Banks Peninsula.

== Behaviour ==
Based on the morphology of their mouthparts, these beetles are inferred to be predators. They are flightless and moderate runners, and will attempt to defend their eggs when disturbed. They are nocturnal and hide under rocks and logs during daytime. Males are more mobile and are more often caught in pitfall traps; females are more commonly found sheltering under logs.

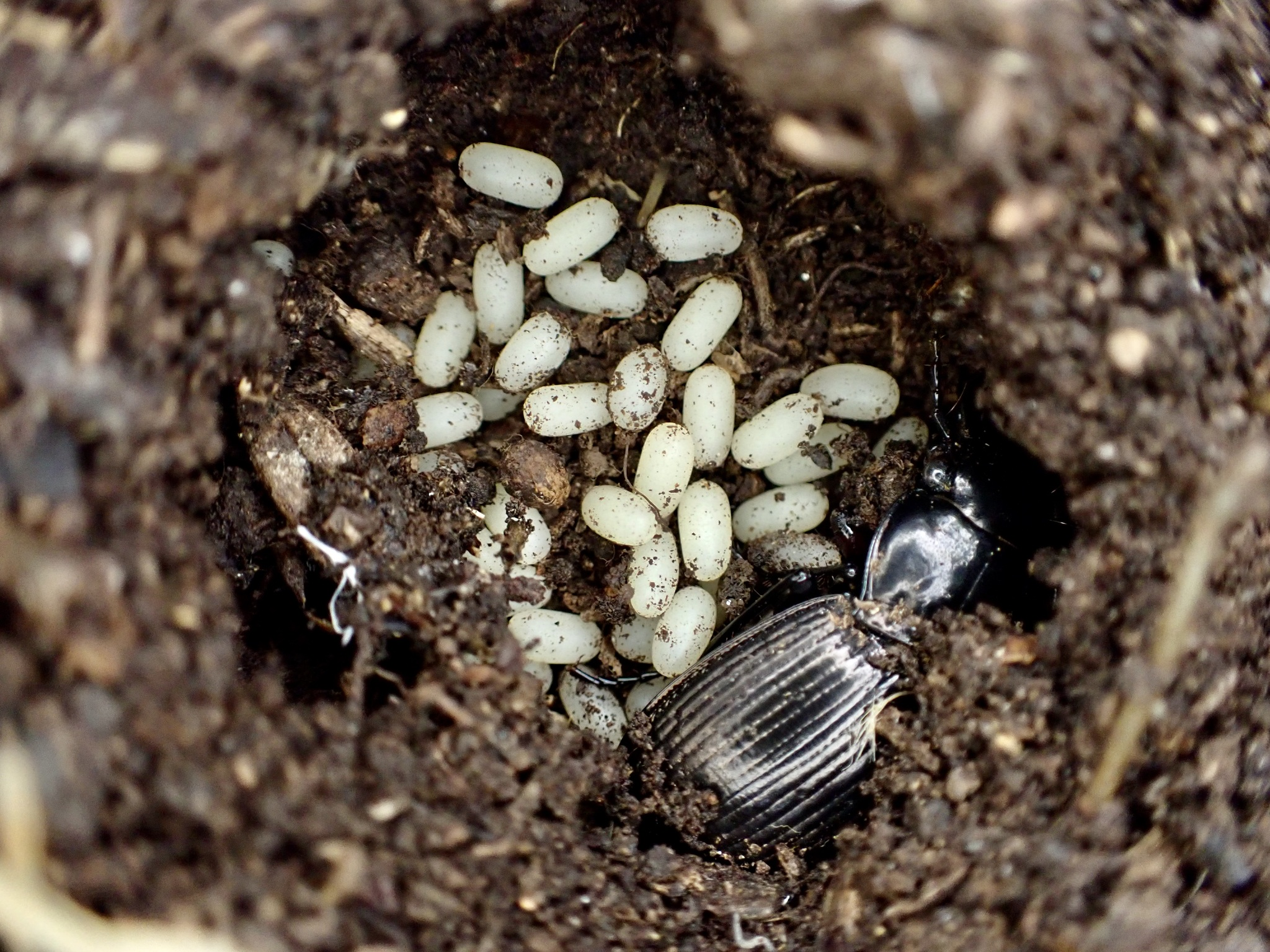
Adult guarding eggs

== Life history ==
Although active most of the year, adults are most commonly seen in spring and summer, when they are breeding, with a peak in November. Gravid females have been observed in December and January. Females dig out a nest and guard eggs until they hatch between October and February. The first brooding of this species was observed in Okuti Reserve in February 1981, and again in October 1982; the eggs from the first brood then hatched, giving the earliest record of first instar larva. Freshly moulted adults are known to occur from February to March.

== Genetics ==
One 2016 study sequenced the COI, ITS2, 18S and 28S genes of Megadromus guerinii collected across Banks Peninsula. From the mitochondrial COI data, two distinct lineages were found, corresponding to the western and eastern populations on the peninsula, with some overlap at the township of Akaroa and Mount Pearce. One hypothesis was this represented a separation during Pliocene glaciation, when the peninsula's ridgelines were higher and less hospitable to beetles. The western population may also have undergone some hybridisation with Megadromus antarcticus, which is mostly found in the west of Banks Peninsula. The study did not find sufficient evidence for cryptic species within M. guerenii.
