= DZJ =

DZJ or variants may refer to:

- Blairsville Airport, an airport in Blairsville, Georgia, U.S.
- Pensioners for Life Security (Czech: Důchodci za životní jistoty; abbreviated DŽJ), a former name of the Party for Life Security party in Czechia focusing on pensioners
- Parantennulidae, a family of mites, by Catalogue of Life identifier
