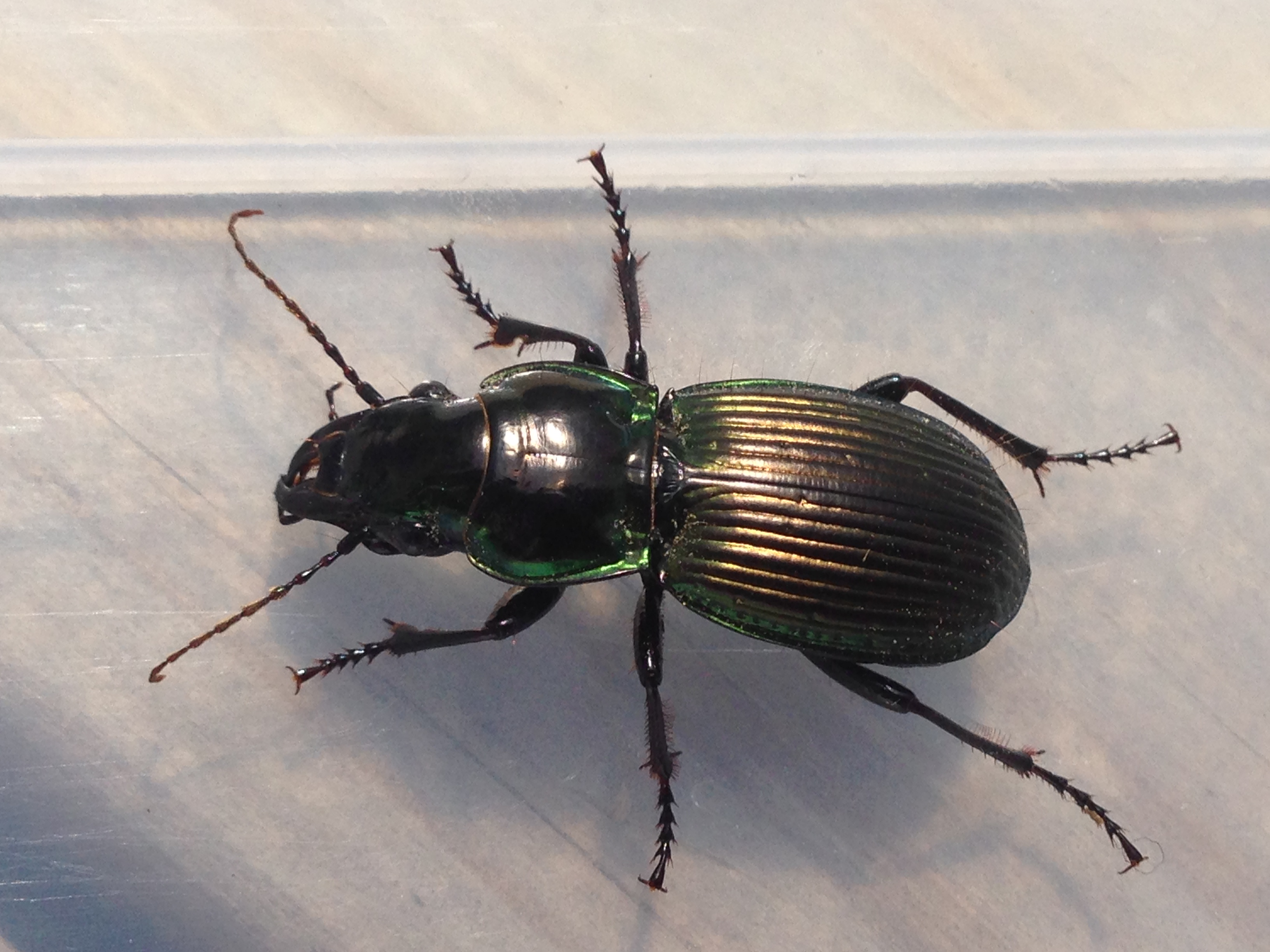
- Megadromus antarcticus

Scientific classification
- Kingdom: Animalia
- Phylum: Arthropoda
- Class: Insecta
- Order: Coleoptera
- Suborder: Adephaga
- Family: Carabidae
- Subfamily: Pterostichinae
- Tribe: Pterostichini
- Subtribe: Pterostichina
- Genus: Megadromus; Motschulsky, 1866

Subgenera
- Megadromus Motschulsky, 1866; Protodromus B.Moore, 1965

= Megadromus =

Genus of beetles

Megadromus is a genus in the beetle family Carabidae. There are at least 30 described species in Megadromus, found in New Zealand.

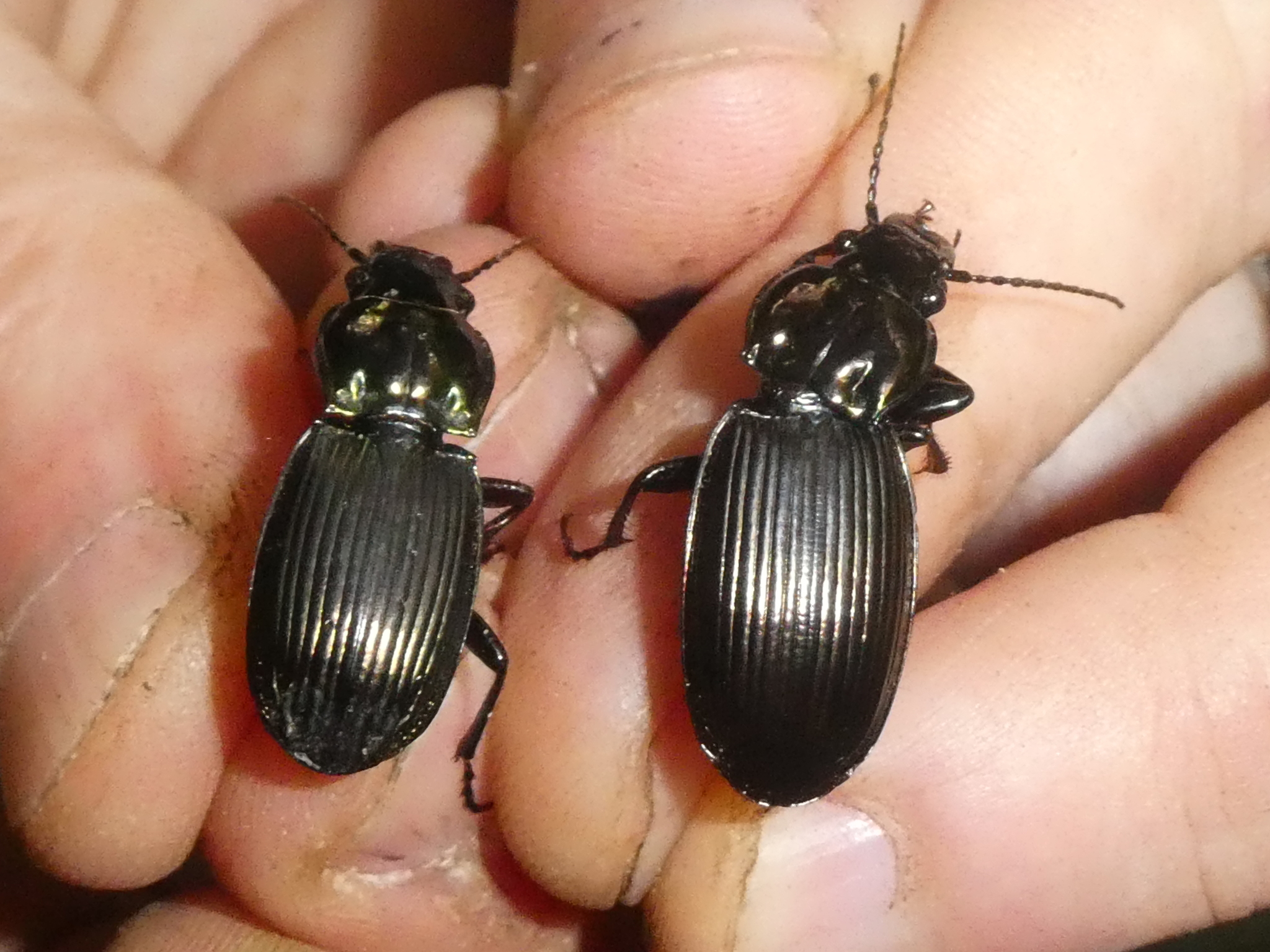
Megadromus bucolicus, New Zealand/Aotearoa

== Species ==
These 30 species belong to the genus Megadromus:

- Megadromus alternus (Broun, 1886)
- Megadromus antarcticus (Chaudoir, 1865)
- Megadromus asperatus (Broun, 1886)
- Megadromus australicus (Sloane, 1916)
- Megadromus bucolicus (Broun, 1903)
- Megadromus bullatus (Broun, 1915)
- Megadromus capito (White, 1846)
- Megadromus compressus (Sharp, 1886)
- Megadromus curtulus (Broun, 1884)
- Megadromus eborensis B.Moore, 1965
- Megadromus enysi (Broun, 1882)
- Megadromus fultoni (Broun, 1882)
- Megadromus guerinii (Chaudoir, 1865)
- Megadromus haplopus (Broun, 1893)
- Megadromus lobipes (Bates, 1878)
- Megadromus memes (Broun, 1903)
- Megadromus meritus (Broun, 1884)
- Megadromus nigrifrons (Sharp, 1886)
- Megadromus omaramae Johns, 2007
- Megadromus rectalis (Broun, 1881)
- Megadromus rectangulus (Chaudoir, 1865)
- Megadromus sandageri (Broun, 1893)
- Megadromus speciosus Johns, 2007
- Megadromus temukensis (Bates, 1878)
- Megadromus turgidiceps (Broun, 1908)
- Megadromus vagans (Broun, 1886)
- Megadromus vigil (White, 1846)
- Megadromus virens (Broun, 1886)
- Megadromus walkeri (Broun, 1903)
- Megadromus wallacei (Broun, 1912)
