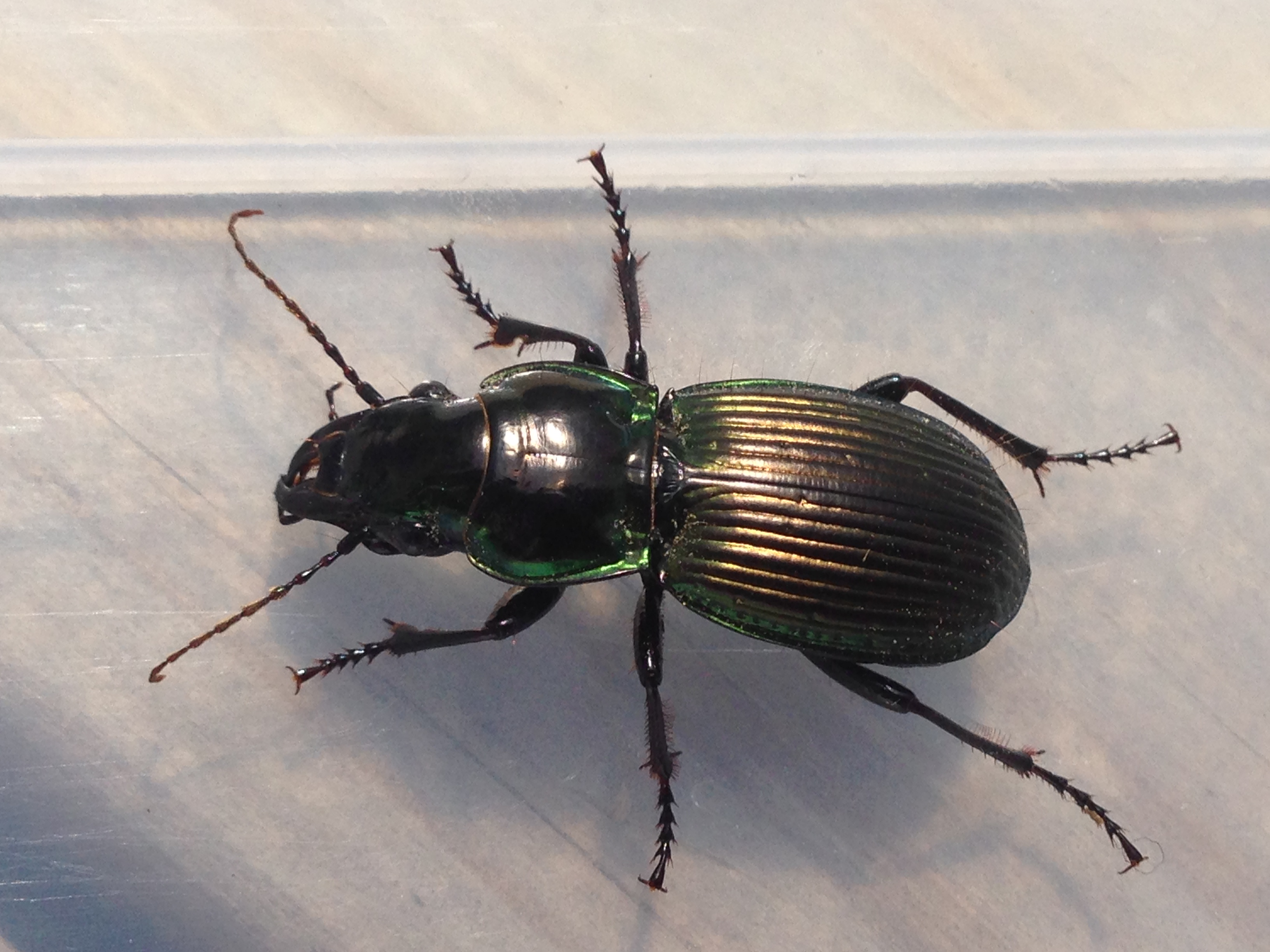

Conservation status
- Relict (NZ TCS)

Scientific classification
- Kingdom: Animalia
- Phylum: Arthropoda
- Class: Insecta
- Order: Coleoptera
- Suborder: Adephaga
- Family: Carabidae
- Subfamily: Pterostichinae
- Tribe: Pterostichini
- Subtribe: Pterostichina
- Genus: Megadromus
- Species: M. antarcticus

Binomial name
- Megadromus antarcticus Chaudoir, 1865

= Megadromus antarcticus =

Species of beetle

Megadromus antarcticus, also known as the “Alexander beetle”, is a member of the Carabidae (ground beetle) family and only found in the Canterbury region of New Zealand. Megadromus antarcticus are easily recognized by their iridescent green colouration.

== Description ==
Megadromus antarcticus size can range in length from 22mm to 34mm. Megadromus antarcticus is a member of the Adephaga suborder which is morphologically defined by the presence of liquid feeding mouth parts as larvae and once matured, has six abdominal ventrites and pygidial glands. Adephaga such as Megadromus antarcticus are also characterized by being well-proportioned with prominent mandibles, long slender legs and straight elytra. Adephaga are cursorial beetles which means they are adapted specifically for running. Megadromus antarcticus is black - greenish with the rims of the pronotum and elytra a metallic green colour. This colouring gives Megadromus antarcticus a fascinating appearance which has also been referred to as iridescent green.

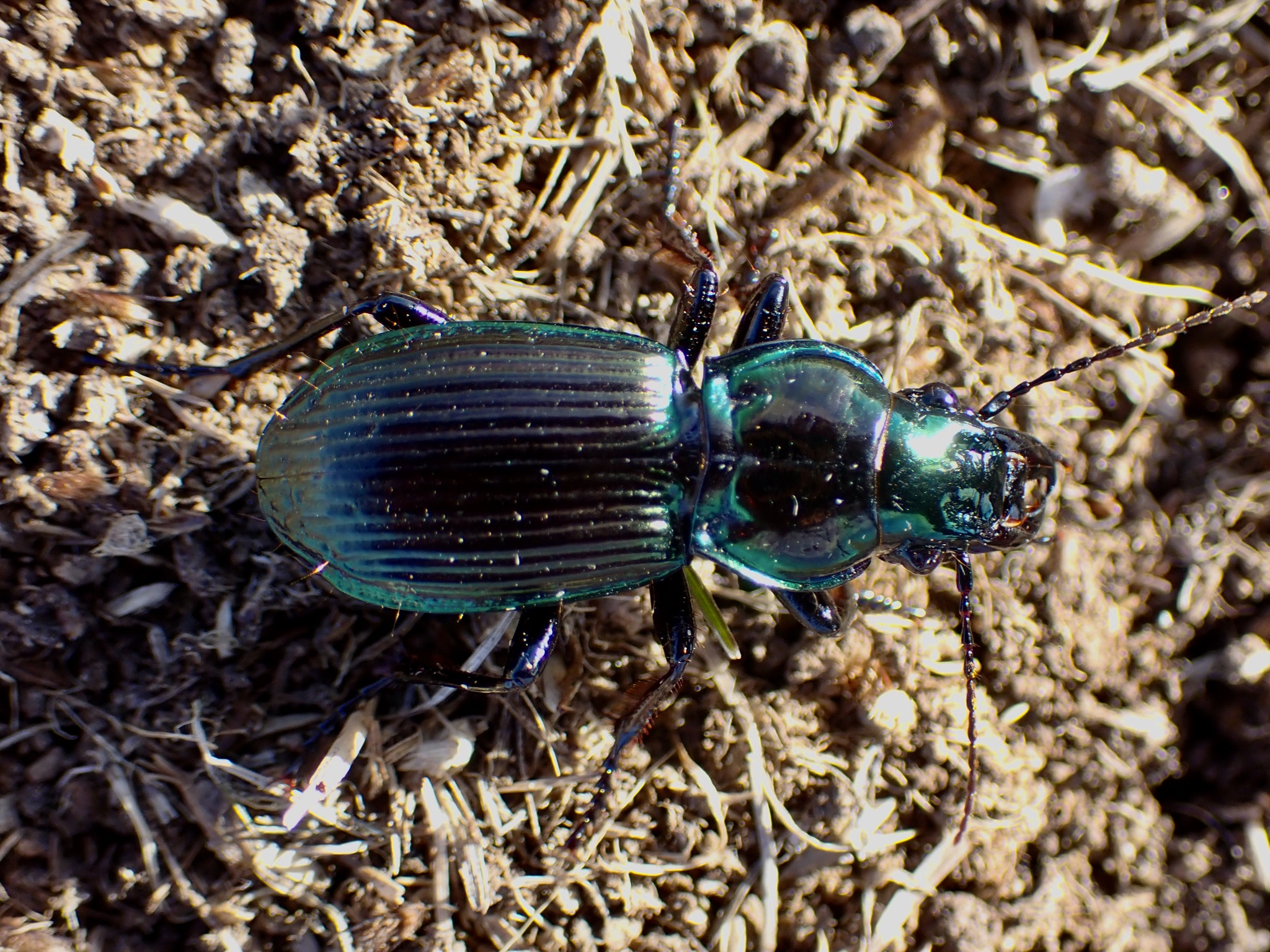

== Distribution ==
=== Natural global range ===
Megadromus antarcticus is endemic to New Zealand.

=== New Zealand range ===
Megadromus antarcticus is common throughout much of the Canterbury region. Their range extents from a northern limit in the Waikari area, to the coast in the east, comprising Banks Peninsula, as far south as the Cave area in South Canterbury, and to the lower reach of the Southern Alps in western Canterbury. Because Megadromus antarcticus is flightless it has limited biological dispersal ability. Additionally the braided rivers of the Canterbury plains present a significant obstacle to Megadromus antarcticus.

=== Habitat preferences ===
Megadromus antarcticus is a generalist predator so can be successful in variety of different habitats. A very common habitat for Megadromus antarcticus to be sighted is in home gardens. Other common Megadromus antarcticus habitats include urban areas, agricultural areas, native forests and exotic forests. They are also frequently been found amongst grassland log sites.

== Life cycle/phenology ==
The incubation period of Megadromus antarcticus eggs varies dependent on the time of year. This incubation period can range from just over four weeks for eggs laid in late August to three weeks for eggs laid in February. Megadromus antarcticus females do not leave their egg chamber to feed during this period making them particularly attentive parents.

== Diet and foraging ==
Megadromus antarcticus is considered a generalist predator. This allows it to feed on variety of different insects and larvae that live in habitats similar to its own. Prey of Megadromus antarcticus includes some species of slugs which are considered pests to the New Zealand agriculture industry. In a study conducted in controlled conditions, Megadromus antarcticus preyed on both Deroceras invadens and Deroceras reticulatum (grey field slug) with an average consumption rate of 0.55 slugs per day.

== Predators, parasites, and diseases ==
Coleoptera which includes Megadromus antarcticus are the most common insects which morepork prey upon. Circus approximans (Australasian harrier) are a bird of prey very common to the Canterbury region and 8% of their diet also consists of Insecta (insects) which includes Megadromus antarcticus. At least one undescribed species of mite belonging to the genus Micromegistus has been found living on Megadromus antarcticus.

== Conservation status ==
Under the New Zealand Threat Classification System, this species is listed as "Relict" with the qualifiers of "Range Restricted" and "Biologically Sparse".
