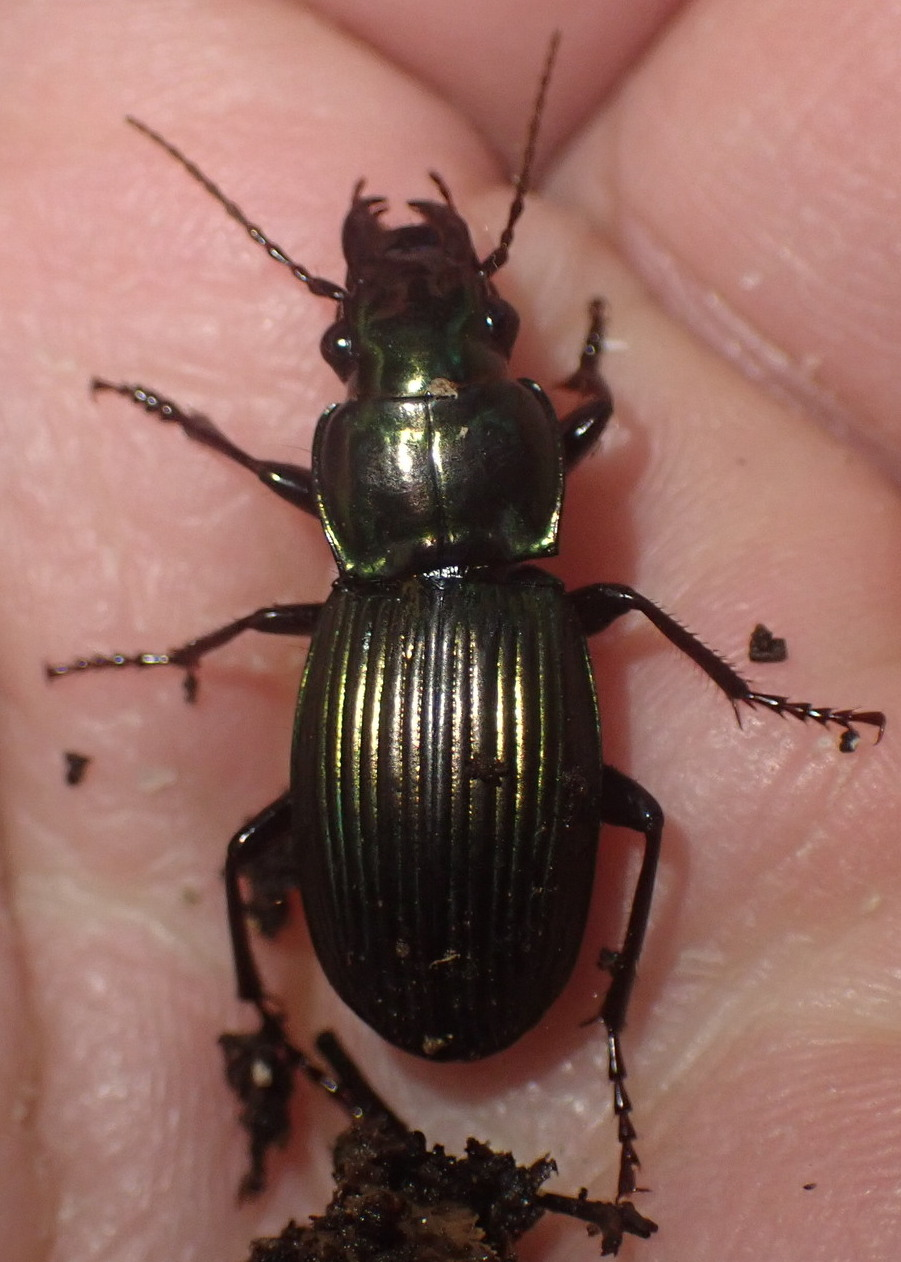

Scientific classification
- Kingdom: Animalia
- Phylum: Arthropoda
- Class: Insecta
- Order: Coleoptera
- Suborder: Adephaga
- Family: Carabidae
- Subfamily: Pterostichinae
- Tribe: Pterostichini
- Subtribe: Pterostichina
- Genus: Megadromus
- Species: M. capito

Binomial name
- Megadromus capito White, 1846

Synonyms
- Megadromus aucklandicus (Bates, 1878); Megadromus humeralis (Broun, 1882); Megadromus cephalotes (Broun, 1886); Megadromus hudsoni (Broun, 1904); Megadromus ordinarius (Broun, 1908)

= Megadromus capito =

Species of beetle

Megadromus capito is a large endemic ground beetle from New Zealand. This beetle hunts on the ground, is active mainly at night and tends to take shelter under debris during the day.

== Taxonomy ==
M. capito was first described by Adam White in 1846.

== Description ==
M. capito is a shiny, black beetle with a thorax cover that can have a greenish appearance. The beetle has horizontal linear groves running the length of its wing covers. They are sexually dimorphic in that the males are significantly larger than the females.

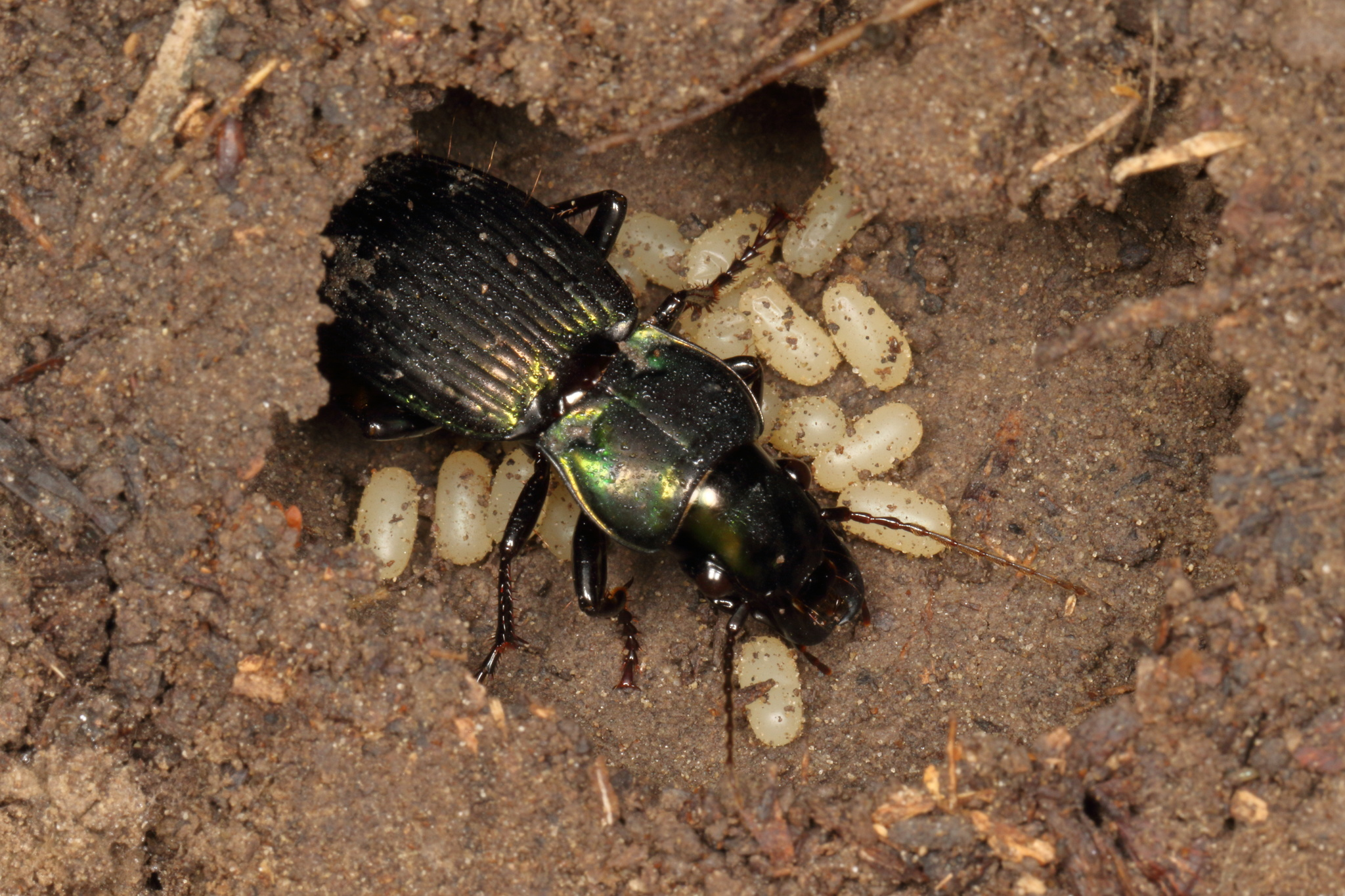
Megadromus capito guarding eggs.

== Life cycle ==
There are three larval instars. M. capito can carry a relatively low number of eggs, with up to 26 being recorded, but on average carry 10.5. They gestate the eggs for at least six months. The females exhibit brooding behaviour where they guard their eggs.

M. capito are regarded as being a long lived species of beetle.
