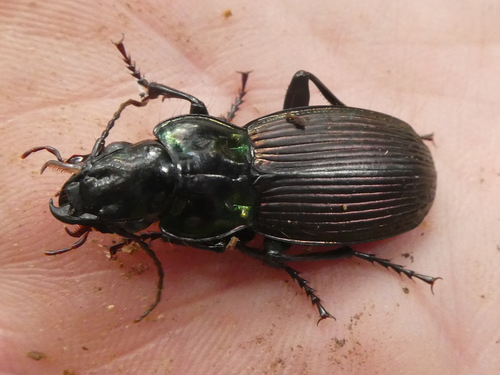
- Megadromus speciosus found in Marlborough, New Zealand

Conservation status
- Relict (NZ TCS)

Scientific classification
- Kingdom: Animalia
- Phylum: Arthropoda
- Class: Insecta
- Order: Coleoptera
- Suborder: Adephaga
- Family: Carabidae
- Genus: Megadromus
- Species: M. speciosus

Binomial name
- Megadromus speciosus Johns, 2007
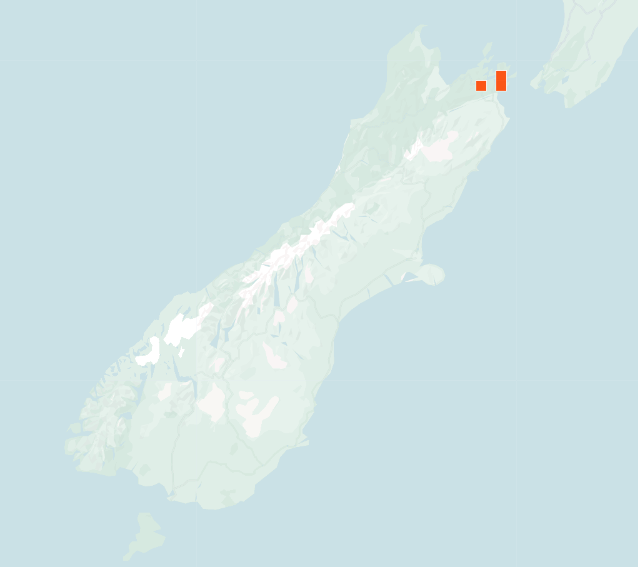
- Observations of Megadromus speciosus from iNaturalist (as of August, 2024).

= Megadromus speciosus =

Species of insect

Megadromus speciosus is a species of ground beetle (family Carabidae), endemic to New Zealand and of high conservation interest.

== Distribution and habitat ==
Megadromus speciosus (Picton ground beetle) is found in just a few forest remnants, in northern South Island New Zealand. The species is typically found under stones and logs, and in areas with deep leaf litter. The habitat is heavily influenced by the presence of wild pigs, which have caused extensive damage to the soil surface and understorey vegetation, particularly at Port Underwood. The species also shows a preference for undisturbed native vegetation.

The species is confined to isolated populations in the Marlborough Sounds, northern South Island, New Zealand. Specifically, it is found at Port Underwood Saddle and Arapawa Island. The Arapawa Island population appears to be more secure, while the Port Underwood population is under threat from habitat degradation. A historical report suggested the presence of the species on Blumine Island, but this was not confirmed in recent surveys. Niche modelling used to study the distribution of this genus found that 50% of the predicted range of Megadromus speciosus is within the New Zealand protected areas network.

== Morphology ==
Megadromus speciosus is described as a large, stout-bodied beetle with a length of 23-26 mm. The dorsal surface of the head and pronotum is greenish, while the elytra have a coppery-purple sheen. Male genitalia are distinct, with an enlarged mesotibia and a forked left paramere. The morphological conservatism within the genus makes species identification challenging without examining genitalia.

== Taxonomy ==
Megadromus speciosus was described in 2007 by Peter Johns from specimens collected from Nothofagus forest near Picton (Port Underwood). The genus Megadromus is part of the Carabidae family, which comprises large, flightless beetles.

Genetic analysis of mitochondrial DNA sequences (COI and ND1 genes), show that M. speciosus is distinct from other related species, with significant sequence divergence.

== Conservation status ==
Under the New Zealand Threat Classification System, this species is listed as "Relict" with the qualifiers of "Range Restricted" and "Biologically Sparse". The species is formally protected under the Wildlife Amendment Act (1980) and has been included in various conservation ranking systems due to its vulnerability to habitat modification and introduced predators.

The primary threat to Megadromus speciosus is habitat degradation caused by wild pigs, especially at Port Underwood Saddle. The pigs have extensively damaged the soil surface and understorey vegetation, which are critical for the species' survival.
