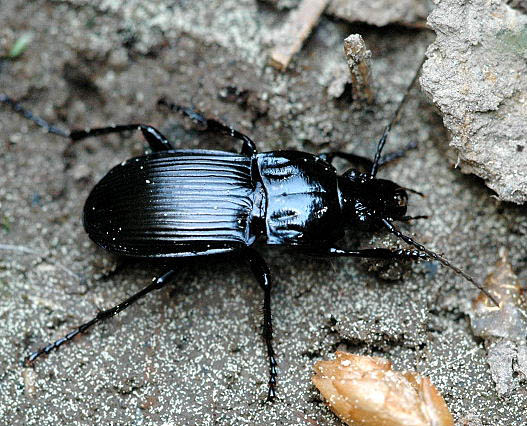
- Abax parallelepipedus

Scientific classification
- Kingdom: Animalia
- Phylum: Arthropoda
- Clade: Pancrustacea
- Class: Insecta
- Order: Coleoptera
- Suborder: Adephaga
- Family: Carabidae
- Genus: Abax
- Subgenus: Abax; Bonelli, 1810

Species
- Abax arerae Schauberger, 1927; Abax baenningeri Schauberger, 1927; Abax benellii Magrini & Degiovanni, 2013; Abax contractus (Heer, 1841); Abax exaratus (Dejean, 1828); Abax fiorii Jakobson, 1907; Abax oblongus (Dejean, 1831); Abax ovalis (Duftschmid, 1812); Abax parallelepipedus (Piller & Mitterpacher, 1783); Abax parallelus (Duftschmid, 1812); Abax pilleri Csiki, 1916; Abax pyrenaeus (Dejean, 1828); Abax sexualis Fairmaire, 1881

= Abax (Abax) =

Subgenus of beetles

Abax is a subgenus of ground beetles.
