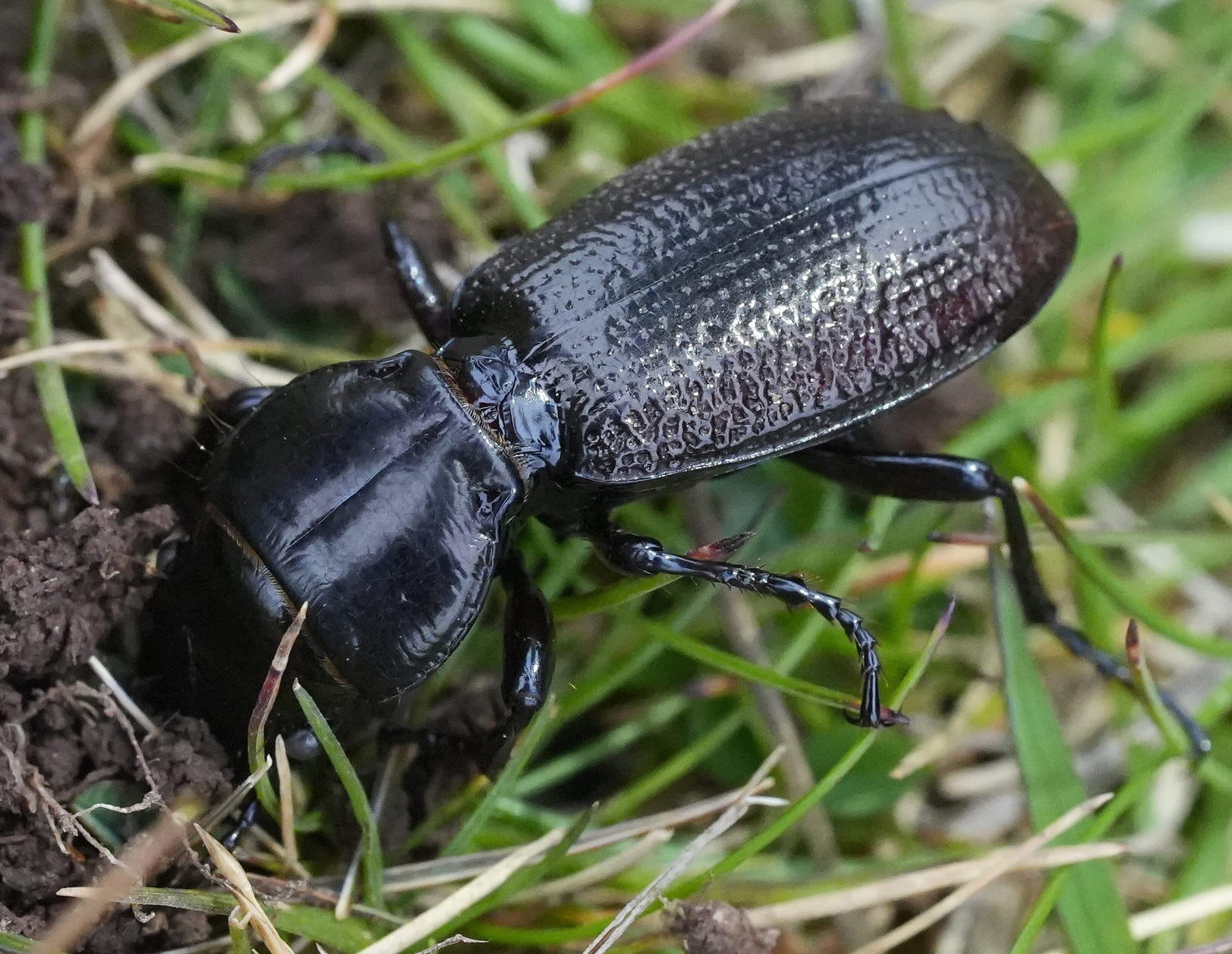

Conservation status
- Declining (NZ TCS)

Scientific classification
- Kingdom: Animalia
- Phylum: Arthropoda
- Class: Insecta
- Order: Coleoptera
- Suborder: Adephaga
- Family: Carabidae
- Genus: Mecodema
- Species: M. howittii

Binomial name
- Mecodema howittii Laporte de Castelnau, 1867

Synonyms
- Mecodema rectolineatum Putzeys, 1868; Mecodema walkeri Broun, 1904

= Mecodema howittii =

Species of beetle endemic to New Zealand

Mecodema howittii is a species of ground beetle in the family Carabidae, endemic to New Zealand. It is restricted to Banks Peninsula in the Canterbury Region of the South Island, where it is the largest carabid species. Due to a contraction of its historical range, it is currently classified as a species in decline under the New Zealand Threat Classification System (NZTCS). M. howittii is nocturnal and predatory, most commonly found beneath logs in forest and grassland habitats during spring and summer.

== Taxonomy ==
M. howittii was first described in 1867 by Francis de Castelnau from a specimen collected near Christchurch. The specific epithet honours its collector, Australian entomologist Godfrey Howitt. De Castelnau noted that it was the largest Mecodema species he had examined.

Although the specific epithet chosen by de Castelnau was Howittii, later entomologists have often referred to it as M. howitti, though in Larochelle and Larivière's catalogue of the New Zealand Carabidae it is correctly named as M. howittii.

The species was subsequently described under two additional names: Mecodema rectolineatum by Jules Putzeys in 1868, and Mecodema walkeri by Thomas Broun in 1904. Both names were later synonymised with M. howittii by Henry Walter Bates in 1874 and Everard Baldwin Britton in 1949.

The type specimen is held at the Museo Civico di Storia Naturale Giacomo Doria in Genoa, Italy.

== Description ==
M. howittii measures between 26–31 mm (1.02–1.22 in) in length, making it the largest of the ten endemic ground beetle species found on Banks Peninsula. Its body is uniformly black, with a smooth and slightly depressed head vertex, and faint or absent punctures. The labium bears three punctures on either side at the base. The pronotum has 10–12 punctures along the lateral margins. The elytra exhibit flattened third and fifth intervals, while the other intervals vary in smoothness and punctation.

== Distribution and habitat ==
This species is restricted to the central and eastern parts of Banks Peninsula, occurring across both lowland and higher altitude sites. Historical records indicate that M. howittii once extended west to the Port Hills, but by the 1980s populations there had disappeared, possibly due to extensive nineteenth-century deforestation and predation by introduced mammals such as rats and mice.

M. howittii inhabits remnants of podocarp and hardwood forest, as well as grassland and even in heavily modified habitats such as pasture. It is frequently found beneath logs, which provide microhabitats that retain moisture and shelter. Populations in pastures are believed to persist in relictual microhabitats where fallen wood remains. Although it was once very common in high ridges where forest had been cleared and logs left to lie in pasture, it disappears when the logs rot away or are burned.

== Behaviour and ecology ==
M. howittii is nocturnal, emerging at night to hunt small invertebrates. It preys on larvae of other beetles, such as Holcaspis suteri, as well as crane flies and (in captivity) mealworms. Activity levels decrease when soil temperatures fall below 6.5 °C (43.7 °F).

Females brooding eggs have been observed between December and January, suggesting breeding occurs during spring and early summer. Like other Mecodema, the species is flightless and lives in burrows or under debris on the forest floor.

== Predators and parasites ==
Native predators of M. howittii are presumed to include large spiders and insectivorous birds such as the morepork (Ninox novaeseelandiae). Historically, weka (Gallirallus australis) may also have preyed upon the beetle, but they are no longer present on Banks Peninsula. Introduced mammals are believed to pose a significant threat to existing populations. A species of mite in the genus Micromegistus has been recorded as a parasite of M. howittii, attaching primarily to the pronotum and metasternum and are most common around the coxae (leg bases).

== Conservation status ==
Under the New Zealand Threat Classification System, M. howittii is listed as "Declining", with the qualifiers "Range Restricted" and "Sparse". Its range remains fragmented across Banks Peninsula and may still be contracting. Contributing factors include poor dispersal ability, predation by introduced mammals, and habitat loss due to deforestation for livestock grazing.
