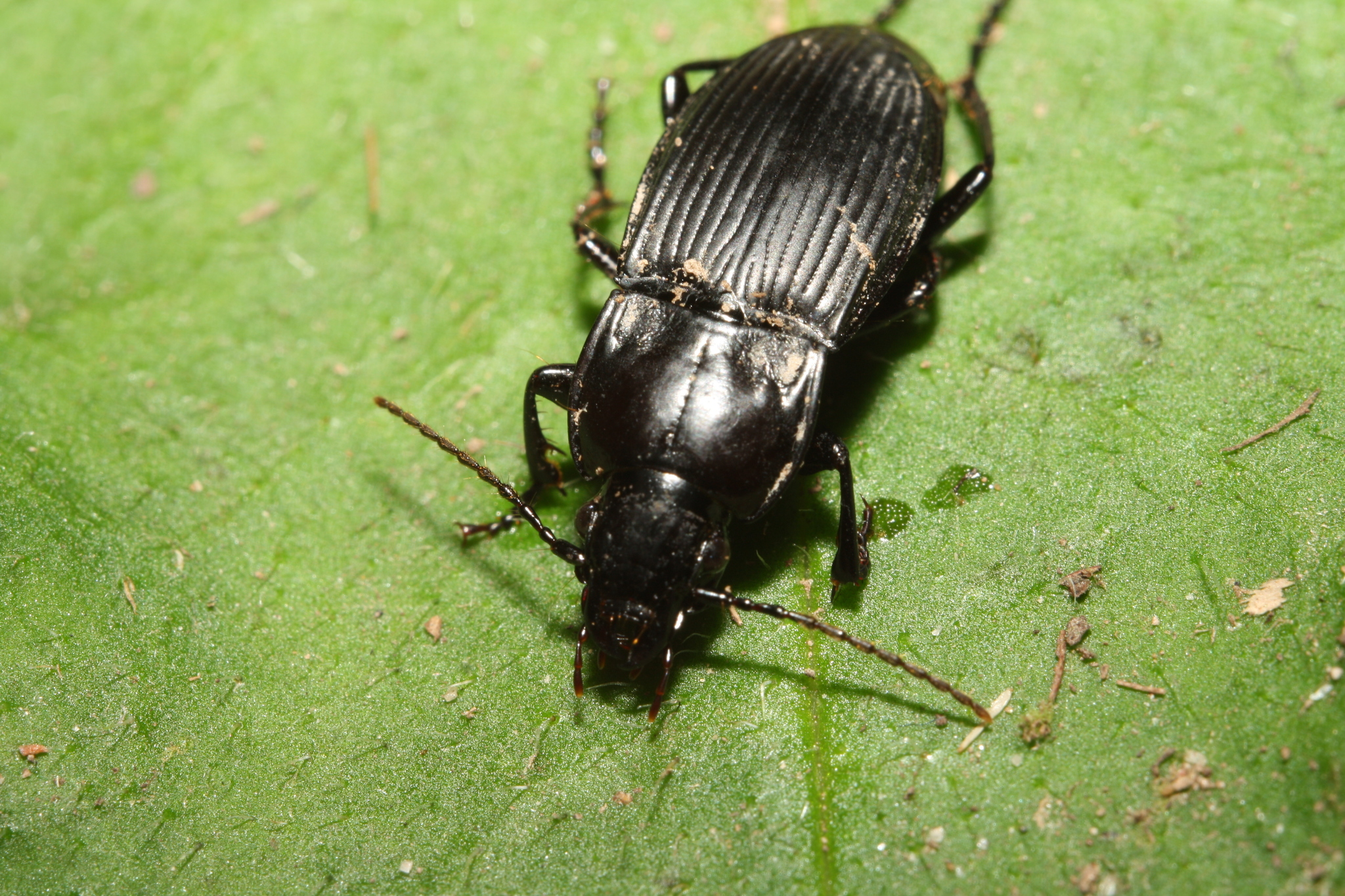
- Abax carinatus, Serbia

Scientific classification
- Kingdom: Animalia
- Phylum: Arthropoda
- Clade: Pancrustacea
- Class: Insecta
- Order: Coleoptera
- Suborder: Adephaga
- Family: Carabidae
- Tribe: Pterostichini
- Subtribe: Pterostichina
- Genus: Abax
- Species: A. carinatus

Binomial name
- Abax carinatus (Duftschmid, 1812)

Synonyms
- Carabus carinatus Duftschmid, 1812

= Abax carinatus =

Species of beetle

Abax carinatus is a species of woodland ground beetle in the family Carabidae. It is found in the Palearctic.

== Subspecies ==
These two subspecies belong to the species Abax carinatus:

- Abax carinatus carinatus (Duftschmid, 1812)
- Abax carinatus sulcatus A.Fiori, 1899 (Italy)
