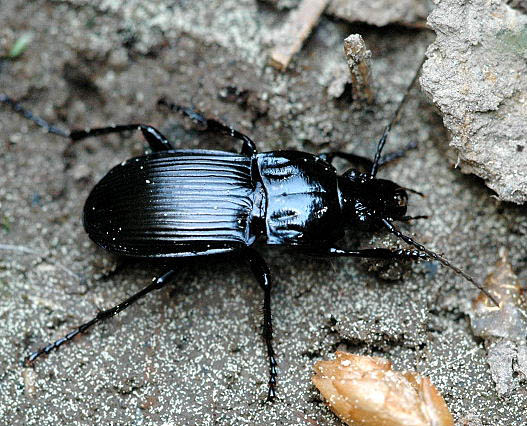

Scientific classification
- Kingdom: Animalia
- Phylum: Arthropoda
- Class: Insecta
- Order: Coleoptera
- Suborder: Adephaga
- Family: Carabidae
- Genus: Abax
- Subgenus: Abax
- Species: A. parallelepipedus

Binomial name
- Abax parallelepipedus (Piller & Mitterpacher, 1783)

Subspecies
- Abax parallelepipedus alpigradus; Abax parallelepipedus audouini; Abax parallelepipedus contractus; Abax parallelepipedus curtulus; Abax parallelepipedus germanus; Abax parallelepipedus inferior; Abax parallelepipedus liguricus; Abax parallelepipedus lombardus; Abax parallelepipedus parallelepipedus; Abax parallelepipedus subpunctatus

= Abax parallelepipedus =

Species of beetle

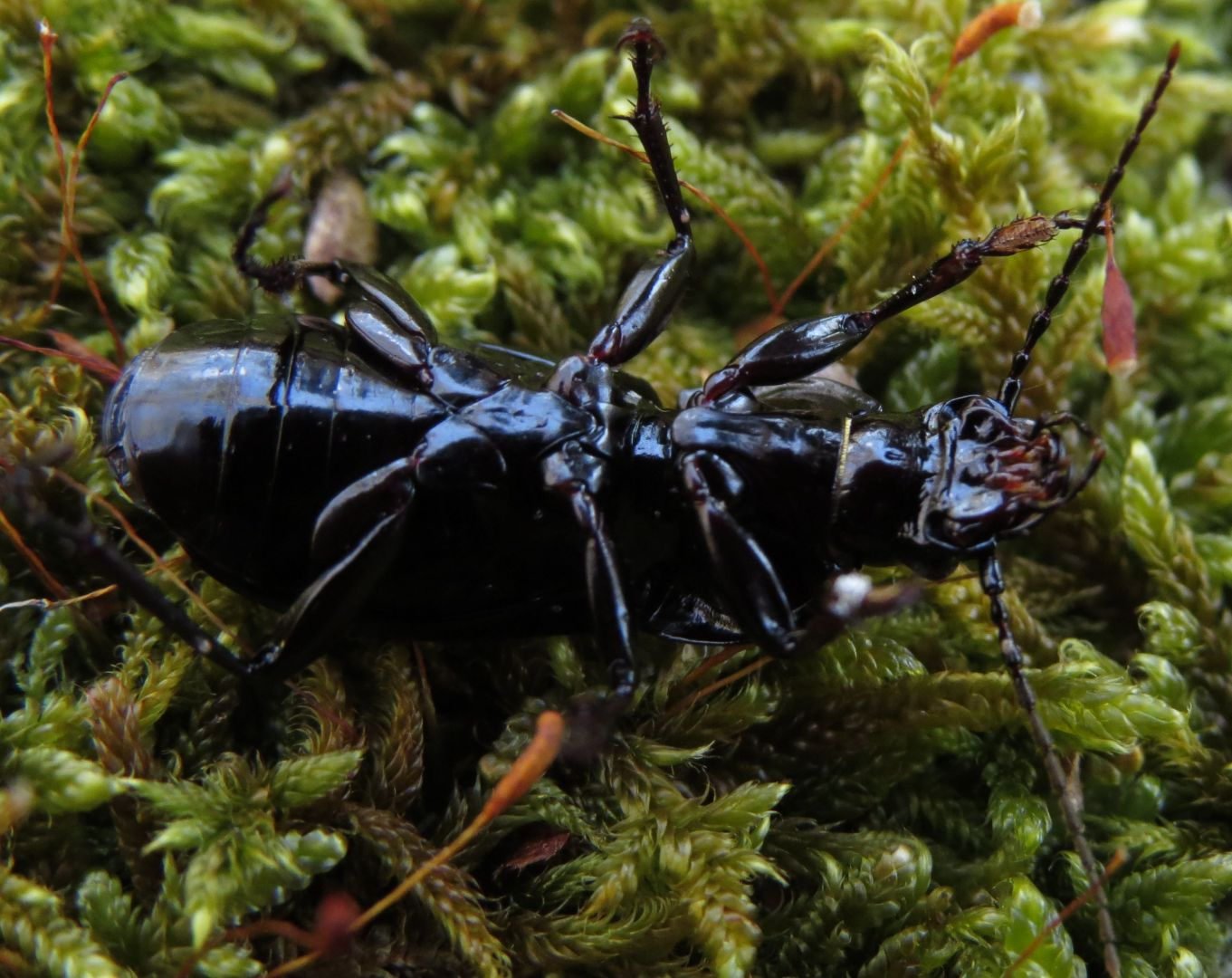
Abax parallelepipedus male underside

Abax parallelepipedus is a species of ground beetle native to Europe, where it is found in Austria, Belgium, Bosnia and Herzegovina, Bulgaria, Croatia, the Czech Republic, mainland Denmark, Estonia, mainland France, Germany, Great Britain, Hungary, mainland Italy, Kaliningrad, Latvia (doubtful), Liechtenstein, Luxembourg, Moldova, mainland Norway, Poland, central and southern Russia, Slovakia, Slovenia, mainland Spain, Sweden, Switzerland, the Netherlands, Ukraine and Yugoslavia. The species is also an introduced species in North America, where it was first detected in 1965. American records are from Atlantic Canada and Jamaica.
