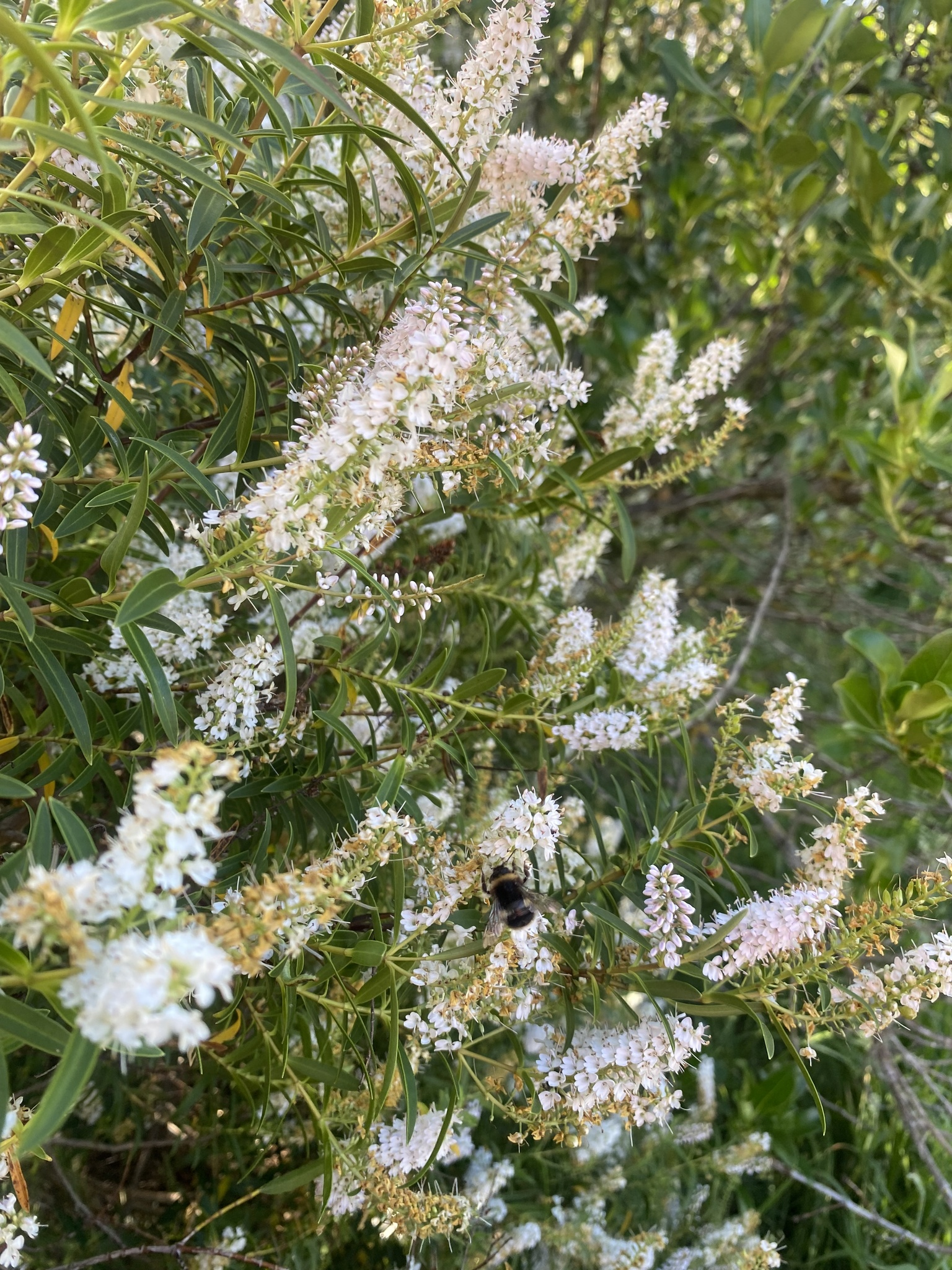
- Foliage of Veronica strictissima

Scientific classification
- Kingdom: Plantae
- Clade: Tracheophytes
- Clade: Angiosperms
- Clade: Eudicots
- Clade: Asterids
- Order: Lamiales
- Family: Plantaginaceae
- Genus: Veronica
- Species: V. strictissima

Binomial name
- Veronica strictissima (Kirk) Garn.-Jones

Synonyms
- Hebe strictissima (Kirk) L.B.Moore; Veronica parviflora var. strictissima Kirk; Veronica leiophylla var. strictissima Cockayne

= Veronica strictissima =

Species of flowering plant in the plantain family

Veronica strictissima, commonly known as the Banks Peninsula hebe, is a flowering plant in the family Plantaginaceae. It is endemic to Banks Peninsula in Canterbury, New Zealand.

== Description ==
Veronica strictissima grows to a rounded shrub to 2 m (6 ft 7 in) tall. Its Latin name refers to its erect stems.

Leaves are opposite and narrowly oblong, 9–49 mm (0.35–1.93 in) long, 3–8 mm (0.12–0.31 in) wide. They are light green in colour with slightly paler undersides.

Inflorescences are racemes up to 17–107 mm (0.67–4.21 in) long. Flowers are hermaphrodite or female on separate plants.

Capsules contain multiple tiny seeds. Seeds are flat and brown, 1.0–1.6 mm (0.04–0.06 in) long.

=== Natural global range ===
Veronica strictissima is endemic to Banks Peninsula, Canterbury, New Zealand. Multiple separate populations have been identified in the region.

=== Habitat preferences ===
Veronica strictissima is an early coloniser of disturbed habitats, occurring in sunny, open areas, such as rocky outcrops, cliffs, scrubland, and roadside banks from sea level up to 853 m (2,800 ft).

Banks Peninsula differs in soil composition compared to other areas of Canterbury, it is made up of loess and basalt rock, while lower Canterbury is predominantly alluvial. V. strictissima has been found to prefer moderate levels of moisture with low salinity and good soil drainage.

== Phenology ==
Veronica strictissima flowers in summer, sometimes till early autumn. Individual plants will flower for 2–5 weeks. The flowers on the spike of one plant will normally flower simultaneously. Flowers are pollinated by a single species of bee native to New Zealand, Lasioglossum sordidum. Seed capsules form during autumn before dehiscing in late autumn. Seeds are wind dispersed, but can also be dispersed by birds and lizards.

== Ecology ==
Veronica strictissima is grazed upon by sheep, goats and cows. The nectar and fruit are eaten by lizards and birds. V. strictissima and other species from the genus Veronica are fed on by Platyptilia, Xyridacma veronicae.

== Cultural uses ==
Veronica strictissima was used as a cure for dysentery during World War II. Māori used the plant as a traditional medicine for the treatment of ulcers, headaches, kidney and bladder troubles.

== Other information ==
Veronica strictissima can be confused with other Veronica species, and was once included with Veronica leiophylla and Veronica parviflora. It is very similar to Veronica traversii, which is far more widespread throughout New Zealand, being found in the Marlborough and Nelson districts as well as Canterbury.

Veronica strictissima may hybridise with Veronica salicifolia.
