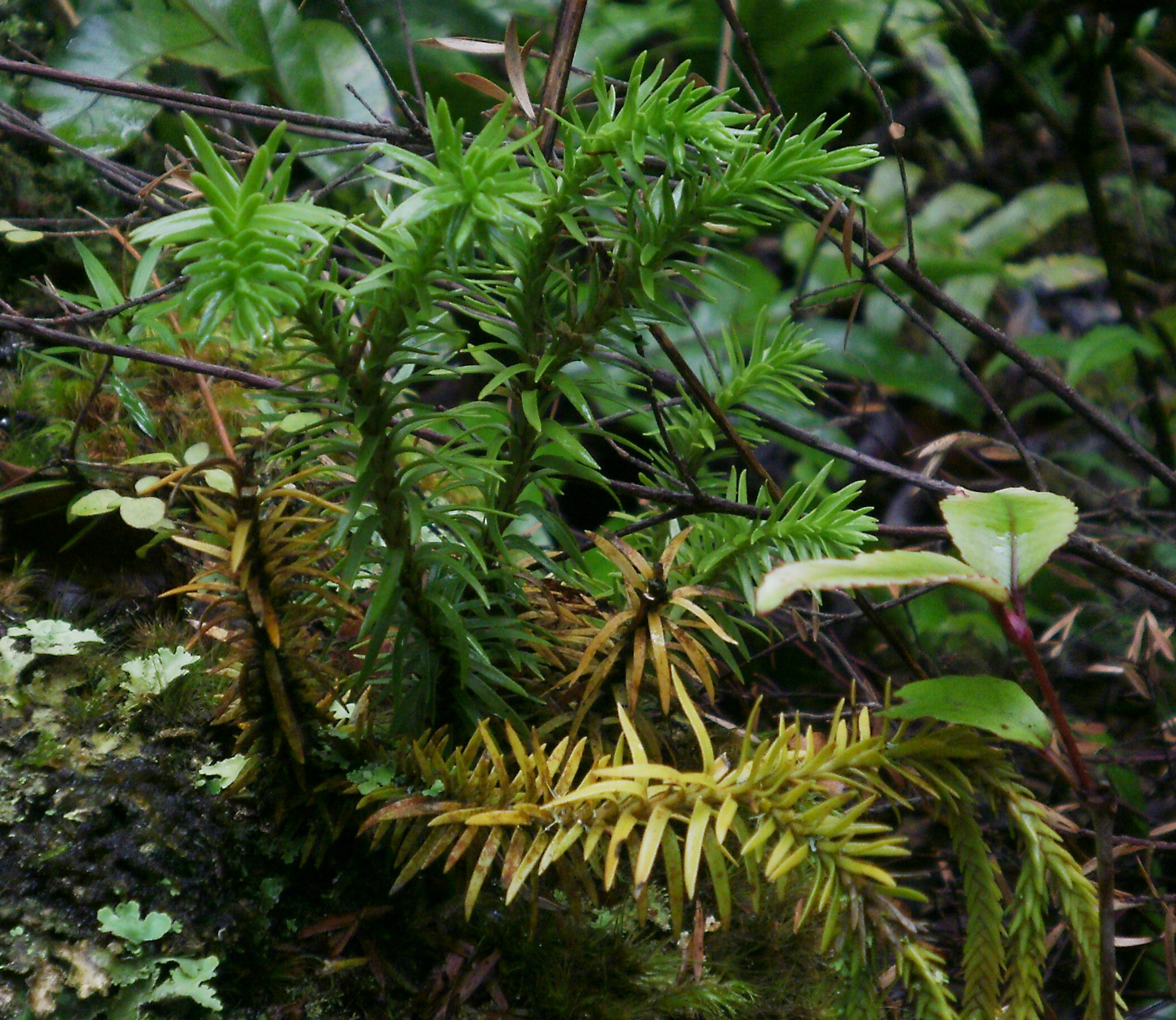
- In Upper Hutt beech forest, New Zealand

Scientific classification
- Kingdom: Plantae
- Clade: Tracheophytes
- Clade: Lycophytes
- Class: Lycopodiopsida
- Order: Lycopodiales
- Family: Lycopodiaceae
- Genus: Phlegmariurus
- Species: P. varius

Binomial name
- Phlegmariurus varius (R.Br.) A.R.Field & Bostock

Synonyms
- Huperzia billardieri (Spring) Trevis.; Huperzia desvauxii Holub; Huperzia novae-zelandica (Colenso) Holub; Huperzia varia (R.Br.) Trevis.; Lycopodium billardierei Spring; Lycopodium flagellaria A.Rich.; Lycopodium novae-zelandicum Colenso; Lycopodium pachystachyum Desv.; Lycopodium phlegmaria A.Cunn.; Lycopodium varium R.Br.; Lycopodium selago var. varium (R.Br.) C.Moore & Betche; Urostachys billardieri (Spring) Herter ex Nessel; Urostachys varius (R.Br.) Herter ex Nessel

= Phlegmariurus varius =

Species of spore-bearing plant

Phlegmariurus varius, is a fir moss or club moss in the family Lycopodiaceae found in areas of Australia, New Zealand and associated islands. It has a number of synonyms including Huperzia varia.

Phlegmariurus varius can grow on the ground and as a lithophyte or epiphyte. It can have one or many branches that are spirally arranged with slender leaves that narrow to a point. The plant varies from green to green-yellow and is sometimes orange in appearance. A recent article provides morphological and genetic evidence to separate Phlegmariurus billardierei, the only species of Lycopodiaceae endemic to New Zealand, from P. varius.
