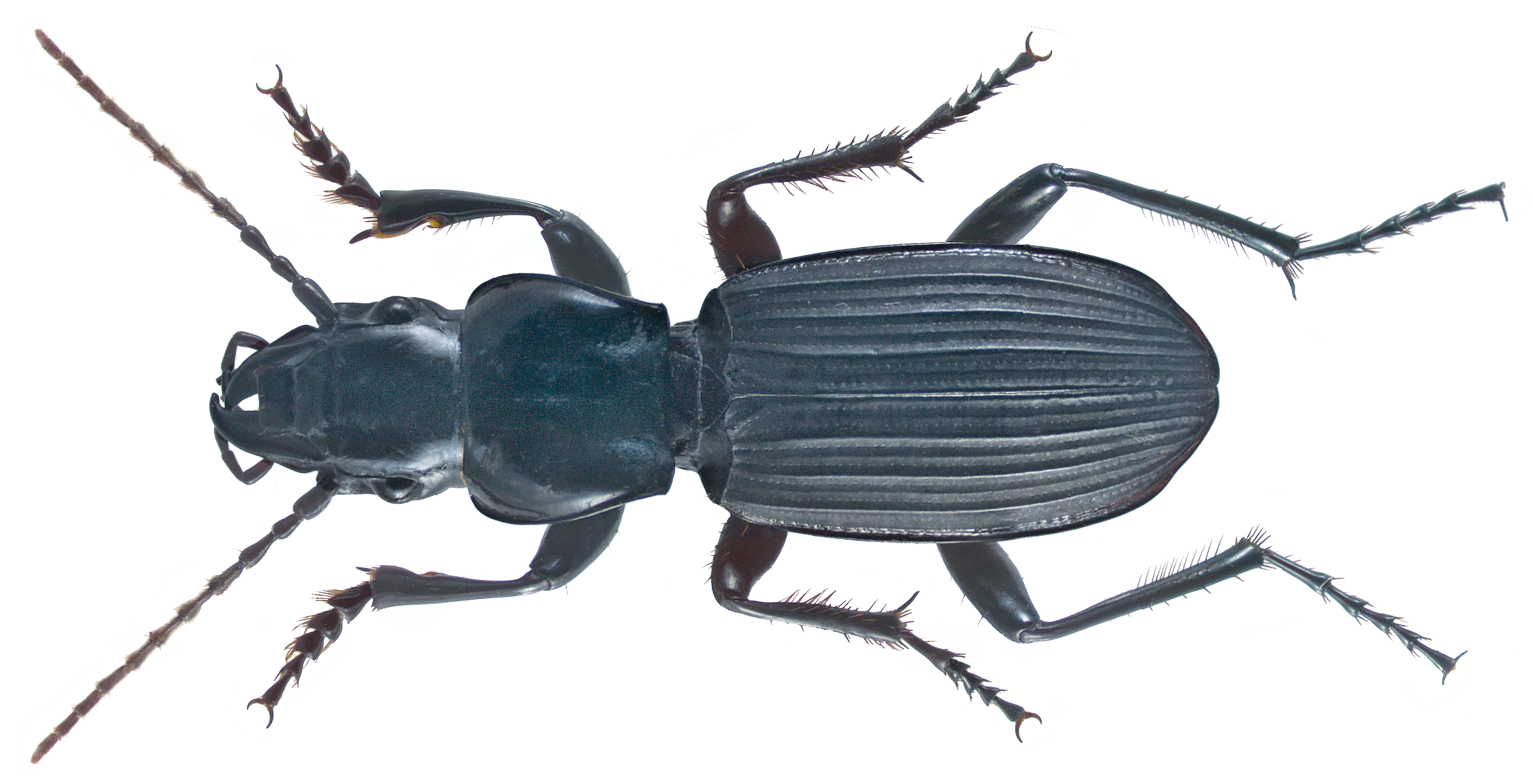
- Trichosternus vigorsi

Scientific classification
- Domain: Eukaryota
- Kingdom: Animalia
- Phylum: Arthropoda
- Class: Insecta
- Order: Coleoptera
- Suborder: Adephaga
- Family: Carabidae
- Subfamily: Pterostichinae
- Tribe: Pterostichini
- Subtribe: Pterostichina
- Genus: Trichosternus; Chaudoir, 1865

= Trichosternus =

Genus of beetles

Trichosternus is a genus in the beetle family Carabidae. There are about 13 described species in Trichosternus, found in Australia.

== Species ==
These 13 species belong to the genus Trichosternus:

- Trichosternus angulosus Chaudoir, 1878
- Trichosternus fax Darlington, 1962
- Trichosternus fisheri Darlington, 1962
- Trichosternus frater Darlington, 1962
- Trichosternus montorum Darlington, 1962
- Trichosternus mutatus Darlington, 1962
- Trichosternus nudipes Darlington, 1962
- Trichosternus relictus Darlington, 1953
- Trichosternus renardi (Chaudoir, 1865)
- Trichosternus simplicipes Sloane, 1923
- Trichosternus soror Darlington, 1953
- Trichosternus subvirens (Chaudoir, 1865)
- Trichosternus vigorsi (Gory, 1833)
