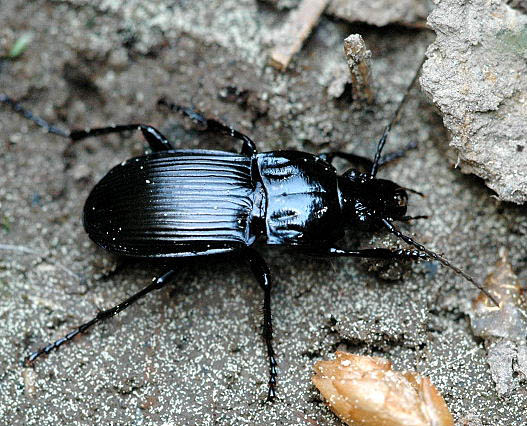
- Abax parallelepipedus

Scientific classification
- Kingdom: Animalia
- Phylum: Arthropoda
- Clade: Pancrustacea
- Class: Insecta
- Order: Coleoptera
- Suborder: Adephaga
- Family: Carabidae
- Subfamily: Pterostichinae
- Tribe: Pterostichini
- Subtribe: Pterostichina
- Genus: Abax; Bonelli, 1810

Subgenera
- Abacopercus Ganglbauer, 1891; Abax Bonelli, 1810; Pterostichoabax Schauberger, 1927

= Abax (beetle) =

Genus of beetles

Abax is a genus of carabid beetles.

These beetles are mostly glossy black with parallel striation on elytra. They are carnivorous.

== Species ==
These 19 species belong to the genus Abax:

- Abax arerae Schauberger, 1927
- Abax baenningeri Schauberger, 1927
- Abax beckenhauptii (Duftschmid, 1812)
- Abax benellii Magrini & Degiovanni, 2013
- Abax carinatus (Duftschmid, 1812)
- Abax contractus (Heer, 1841)
- Abax ecchelii Bertolini, 1887
- Abax exaratus (Dejean, 1828)
- Abax fiorii Jakobson, 1907
- Abax oblongus (Dejean, 1831)
- Abax ovalis (Duftschmid, 1812)
- Abax parallelepipedus (Piller & Mitterpacher, 1783)
- Abax parallelus (Duftschmid, 1812)
- Abax pilleri Csiki, 1916
- Abax pyrenaeus (Dejean, 1828)
- Abax schueppeli Palliardi, 1825
- Abax sexualis Fairmaire, 1881
- Abax springeri G.Müller, 1925
- Abax teriolensis Schauberger, 1921
