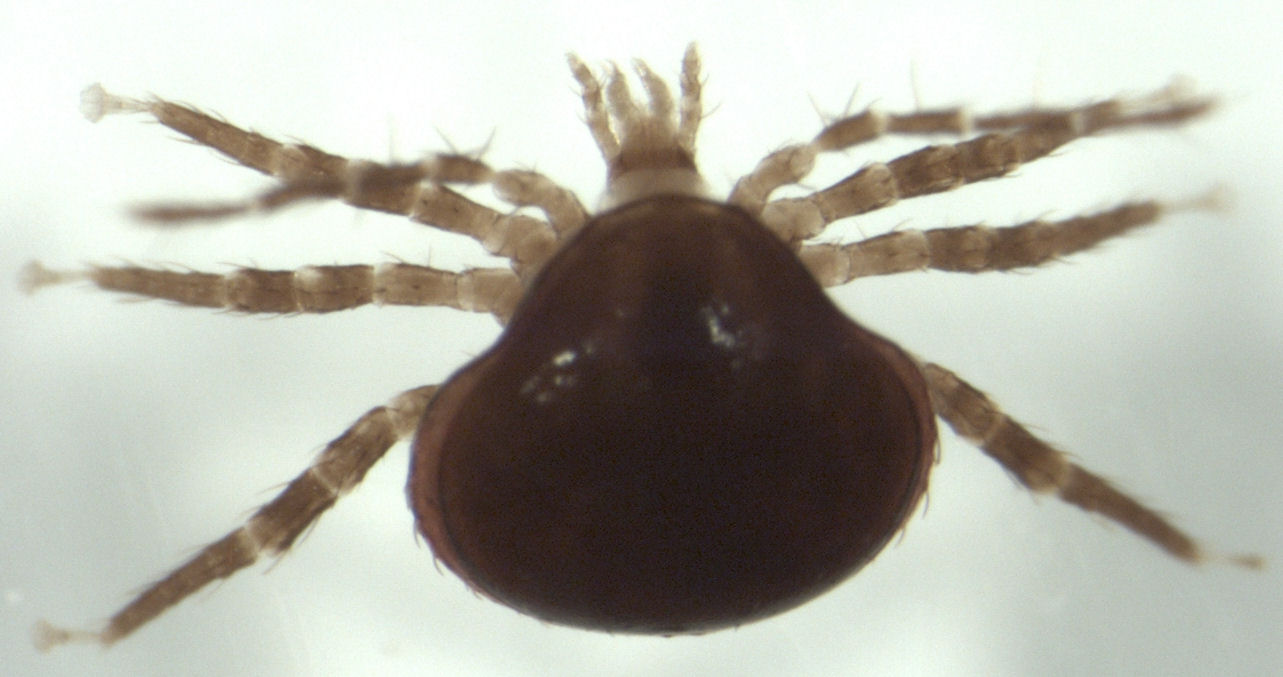
- Micromegistus sp. (dorsal view)

Scientific classification
- Kingdom: Animalia
- Phylum: Arthropoda
- Subphylum: Chelicerata
- Class: Arachnida
- Order: Mesostigmata
- Infraorder: Antennophorina
- Superfamily: Parantennuloidea
- Family: Parantennulidae; Willmann, 1940

= Parantennulidae =

Family of mites

Parantennulidae is a family of mites in the order Mesostigmata.

== Species ==
Parantennulidae contains three genera, with four recognized species:

- Genus Parantennulus Berlese, 1904
  - Parantennulus scolopendrarum (Berlese, 1886)
- Genus Diplopodophilus Willmann, 1940
  - Diplopodophilus antennophoroides Willman, 1940
- Genus Micromegistus Trägårdh, 1948
  - Micromegistus bakeri Trägårdh
  - Micromegistus gourlayi Womersley, 1958
