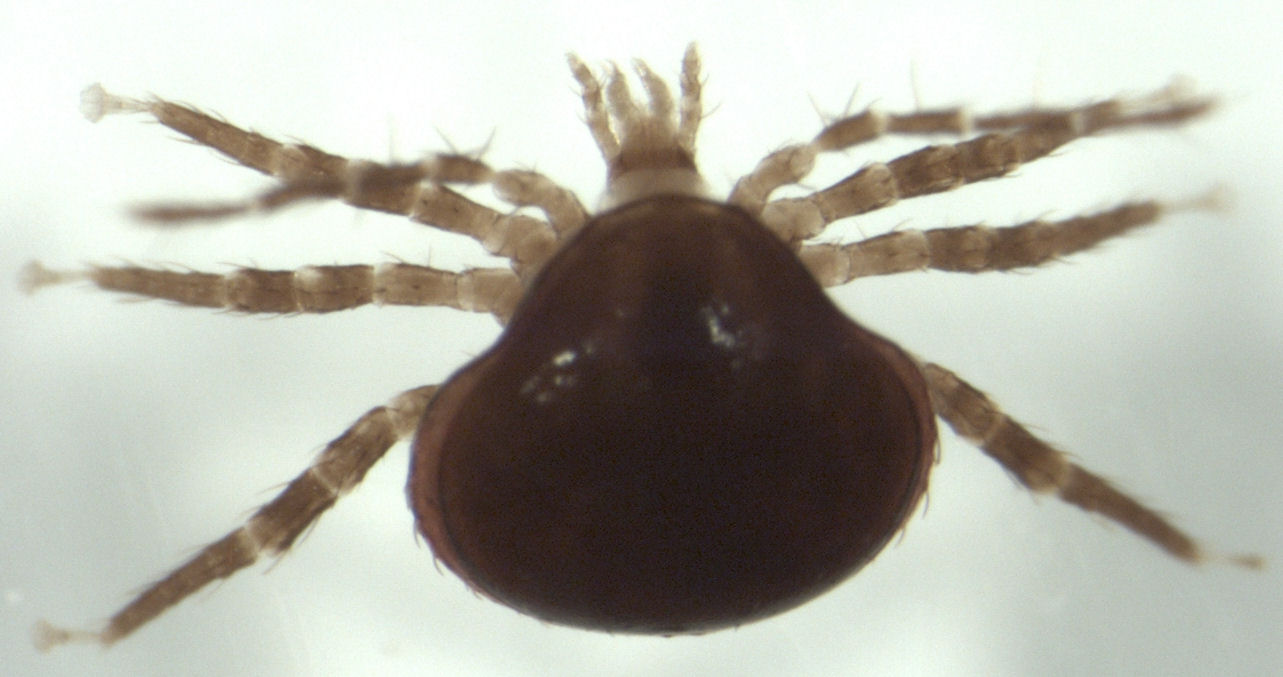
- Micromegistus sp. (dorsal view)

Scientific classification
- Kingdom: Animalia
- Phylum: Arthropoda
- Subphylum: Chelicerata
- Class: Arachnida
- Order: Mesostigmata
- Family: Parantennulidae
- Genus: Micromegistus; Trägårdh, 1948

Type species
- Micromegistus bakeri Trägårdh, 1948

= Micromegistus =

Genus of mites

Micromegistus is a genus of mites in the family Parantennulidae, symbiotic (Note: The exact relationship between these mites and their beetle hosts is unknown.) on beetles.

== Ecology ==
All described species of Micromegistus are associated with ground beetles (Carabidae), though there are records of undescribed Micromegistus associated with other beetle families, such as the darkling beetles (Tenebrionidae). Little is known about the habits of the mites, though it is assumed that they may be "scavengers and kleptoparasites, i.e., eating trash and stealing food", according to researcher Owen Seeman. They may qualify as commensual or mutualist with their hosts. However, the impact their activities such as kleptoparasitism may have on their hosts is unknown.

== Behavior ==
The species Micromegistus bakeri has been recorded to prefer the ventral surface (i.e. underside) of their beetle hosts, with a particular preference for the "area around the junction of the prothorax and mesothorax", according to a study by Riggins et al., which also noted that the mites were frequently found on the beetle's mandibles. Meanwhile, Micromegistus in Australia have been found to inhabit the space underneath the elytra of their host.

== Species ==
Micromegistus contains four described species, although there are known to be a number of species which have not yet been described.

- M. bakeri Trägårdh, 1948
- M. gourlayi Womersley, 1958
- M. thorpei Seeman, 2025
- M. viduus (Berlese, 1888)
