= David Robertson-Macdonald =

Scottish naval officer

Admiral David Robertson-Macdonald
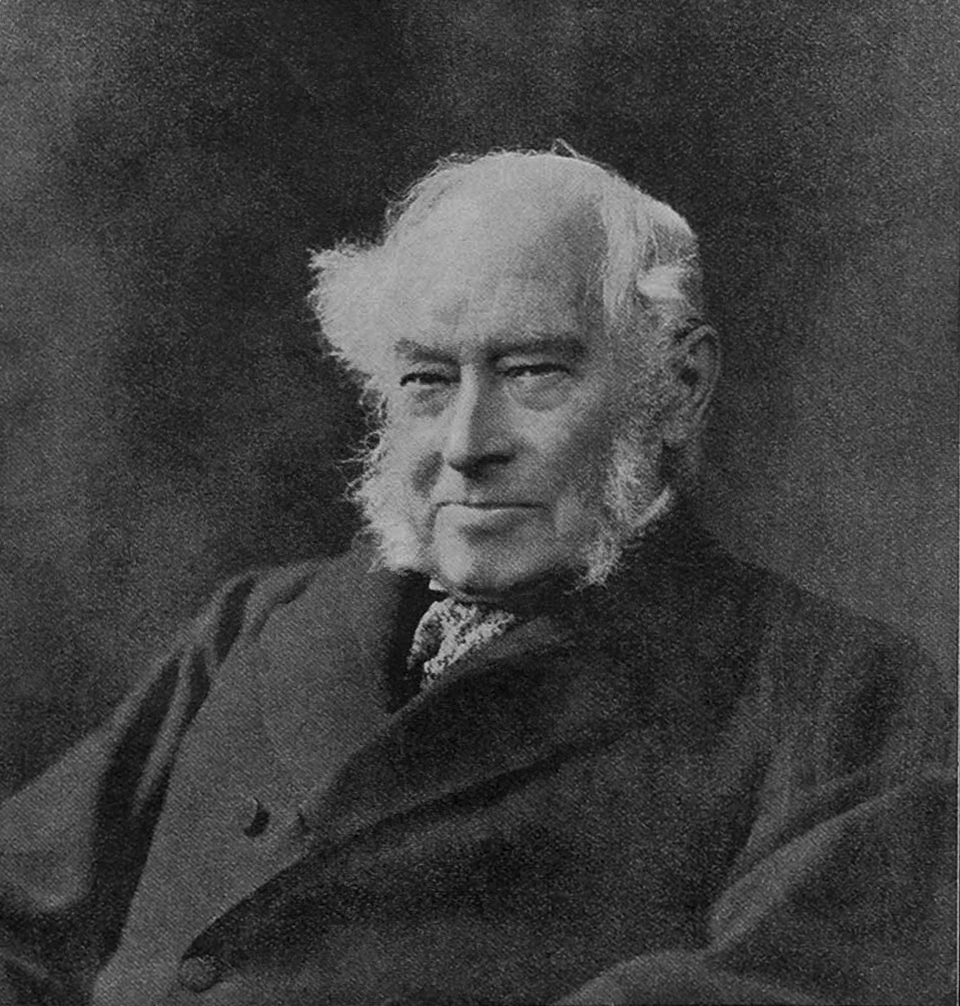
- David Robertson-Macdonald, 1900
- Born: 6 August 1817
- Died: 16 May 1910 (aged 92); Edinburgh, Scotland
- Burial place: Greyfriars Kirkyard, Edinburgh
- Other name: David Robertson
- Spouse: Caroline Beck (m. 1848)
- Relatives: William Robertson (grandfather); David Robertson MacDonald (father); William Robertson (uncle)
- Military career
- Allegiance: United Kingdom
- Branch: Royal Navy
- Service years: 1831–1867
- Rank: Admiral
- Commands: HMS Hazard, 1844–45; HMS Cygnet, 1848–50
- Battles: First Opium War; New Zealand Wars; Flagstaff War; Kororāreka (WIA)
- Awards: China War Medal; New Zealand War Medal; RNLI Silver Medal
- Other work: Inspecting Commander, HMCG, 1851–58; Assistant Inspector of Lifeboats, RNLI, 1862–79

Admiral David Robertson-Macdonald, 11th of Kinlochmoidart (6 August 1817 – 16 May 1910), also known as David Robertson, was a Scottish officer in the Royal Navy.

He joined the Royal Navy as a volunteer, and saw service off the Portuguese and Spanish coast, in the West Indies and in the Mediterranean. Promoted to Lieutenant in August 1841, he served in HMS Hazard in the 1842 war with China, before the ship was posted to New Zealand.

In August 1844, Lieutenant Robertson assumed the role of Acting Commander of HMS Hazard, following the death of Commander Charles Bell, RN, at Kororāreka, New Zealand. At Kororāreka in the early morning of 11 March 1845, Commander Robertson, with a party of 45 sailors and marines, repulsed the first attack of the Battle of Kororāreka from Kawiti, Pumuka and their party of some 200 warriors, at Christ Church and along Matavia Pass. Missing presumed dead following the naval party's withdrawal to the stockade, he was later found concealed in scrub, alive but dangerously wounded in the legs, and carried off to the safety of the stockade. He was later commended for his bravery, and was promoted to Commander.

In 1849, he was appointed to the command of HMS Cygnet stationed on the West Coast of Africa, where he spent a year involved in the suppression of the Atlantic slave trade, capturing a number of slave ships. In 1851 he became an Inspecting Commander in Her Majesty's Coastguard, until 1858 when he was promoted to the rank of Captain. From 1862 to 1879 he served as an Assistant Inspector of Lifeboats to the Royal National Lifeboat Institution.

Retiring in the rank of Captain, he later received further promotions in retirement, finally becoming an admiral in July 1885. He died in Edinburgh on 16 May 1910 aged 92.

== See also ==
- Macdonald, Angus; Macdonald, Archibald (1904). The Clan Donald. Vol. 3. Inverness: The Northern Counties Publishing Company, Ltd. pp. 291, 306–308.
- "Admiral David Robertson-Macdonald, 11th of Kinlochmoidart". Electric Scotland.
