= HMS Hazard (1837) =

Sloop of the Royal Navy

History

United Kingdom
- Name: HMS Hazard
- Ordered: 10 June 1823
- Builder: Portsmouth Dockyard
- Cost: £10,500
- Laid down: May 1829
- Launched: 21 April 1837
- Completed: 5 July 1837
- Fate: Broken up by 12 February 1866

General characteristics
- Class & type: 18-gun Favorite-class sloop
- Tons burthen: 431 bm
- Length: 109 ft 6 in (33.38 m) (overall); 86 ft 9.5 in (26.454 m) (keel)
- Beam: 30 ft 9 in (9.37 m)
- Depth of hold: 12 ft 9 in (3.89 m)
- Sail plan: Full-rigged ship
- Complement: 125
- Armament: 2 × 9-pdrs (bow); 16 × 32-pdr carronades

HMS Hazard was an 18-gun Favorite-class sloop of the Royal Navy. She was one of four Favorite-class ship sloops, which were a ship-rigged and lengthened version of the 1796 Cruizer-class brig-sloop. All four ships of the class were ordered on 10 June 1823. She was launched in 1837 from Portsmouth Dockyard.

== Service off West Africa and in the Mediterranean Station ==
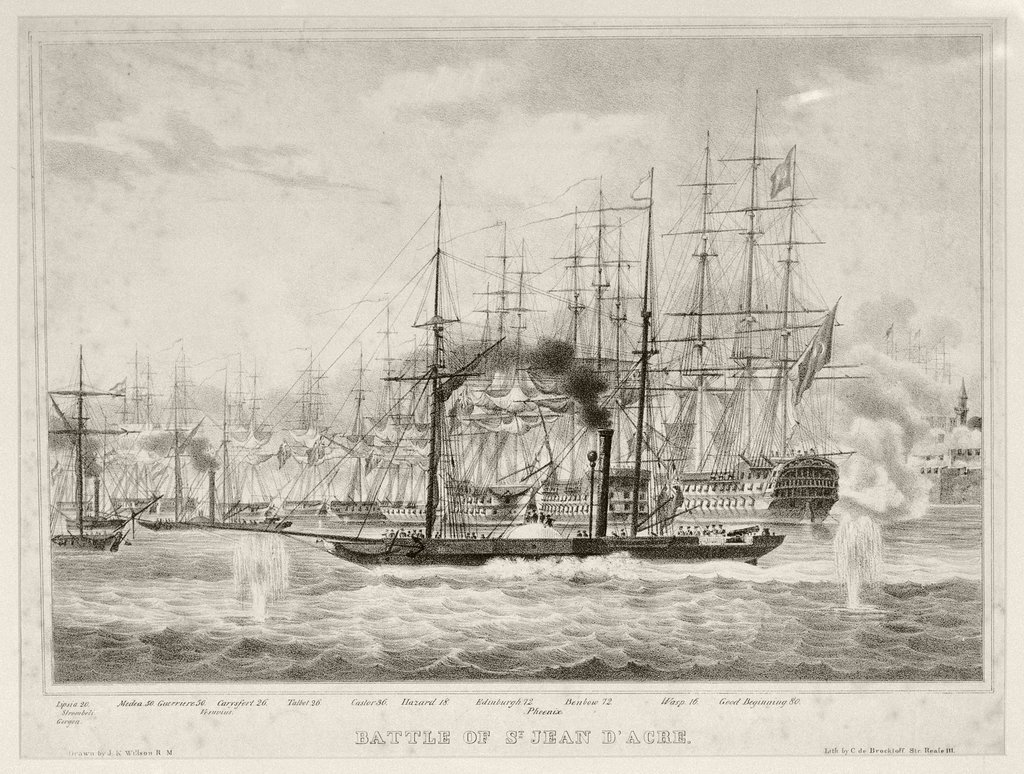
Hazard is in this picture of the Battle of St. Jean d'Acre, 3 November 1840

In July 1837 Hazard sailed for the coast of Senegal to protect British shipping and to patrol the coast of West Africa.

In October 1837 she was in the Mediterranean. She took part in the Egyptian–Ottoman War (1839–1841), also known as the Second Syrian War, when the British Mediterranean Fleet under Admiral Sir Robert Stopford, supported the Ottoman Empire and took action to compel the Egyptians to withdraw from Beirut. During the Oriental Crisis of 1840 Hazard was involved in the bombardment of St. Jean d’Acre on 3 November 1840. In September 1841, she returned to Portsmouth then sailed to Hong Kong to serve in the East Indies and China Station.

== Service in the East Indies and China Station ==
=== China and the First Anglo-Chinese War ===
During the period 1841–42 she served with Sir William Parker's ships in the First Anglo-Chinese War (1839–42), known popularly as the First Opium War.

=== Australia ===
Hazard arrived at Sydney, New South Wales, on 15 December 1842, having left Singapore on 18 October, and Anyer, Java, on 1 November, for refitting.

The French moved to seize control of Tahiti from Queen Pōmare IV and the Tahitians in 1843. HMS Vindictive sailed for the islands on 22 January, carrying George Pritchard, British Consul to Tahiti. Hazard followed out for Tahiti on 25 January, and then to cruise about the South Seas in search of the whaler Waterwitch which had been seized by the mate. In May, The Australian reported:

Captain Bell, of H.M.S. Hazard, on his arrival at Tahiti, sent a boat ashore in command of an officer, which, on reaching, was at once seized by the French guard stationed on Papiete beach, and the officer and his crew were taken prisoners. After a detention, however, of several hours, they were 'sent off' to their ship, with the understanding that 'the subjects of Great Britain could not on any account be allowed to land on that Island,' as the French Governor declared the Island 'to be in a state of siege.' This declaration, on the part of the French Governor, is really too Quixotic to be viewed in any other light than that of pity—the act of besieging an unfortified place, must be brave indeed!

=== New Zealand and the Flagstaff War ===
Departing Sydney, New South Wales, on 4 July 1844, HMS Hazard, under Commander Charles Bell, RN, arrived at Auckland, New Zealand, on 12 July.

In August, HMS Hazard sailed to Port Nicholson, with the Governor of New Zealand, Captain Robert FitzRoy, RN. Though Commander Bell had been advised to stay over in Auckland due to illness, for his health he instead joined HM Colonial brig Victoria's cruise to the Bay of Islands. After arrival at the bay on Thursday 8 August, Commander Bell fell overboard between 9:00 and 10:00 pm, and died soon after rescue.

Hazard, under Acting Commander David Robertson, operated in the Bay of Islands in New Zealand during the Flagstaff War in 1845. Hazard was in the Bay of Islands on 11 March 1845 when a force of about 600 Māori armed with muskets, double-barrelled guns and tomahawks attacked Kororāreka (as Russell was then known). Royal Marines and sailors from Hazard took part in the fighting ashore aiding a detachment of the 96th Regiment during the Battle of Kororāreka. Robertson was dangerously wounded during the opening engagement. The Hazard lost 6 men killed and 8 wounded. Lieutenant George Phillpotts ordered the bombardment of Kororāreka. In the evening, HM Colonial brig Victoria departed for Auckland with urgent despatches and her share of refugee women and children. Most other refugees of Kororareka sailed for Auckland on 13 March 1845, in the Hazard, English whaler Matilda, schooner Dolphin, and the 21-gun USS St. Louis.

On 30 June 1845 a small naval brigade from both HMS Hazard and HMS North Star supported the 58th Regt. and other colonial forces at the Battle of Ohaeawai. The colonial forces were repulsed by Māori warriors with serious losses including Lieutenant George Phillpotts, RN, son of Henry Phillpotts, Bishop of Exeter.

HMS Hazard departed New Zealand at the Bay of Islands for Hong Kong in November 1845.

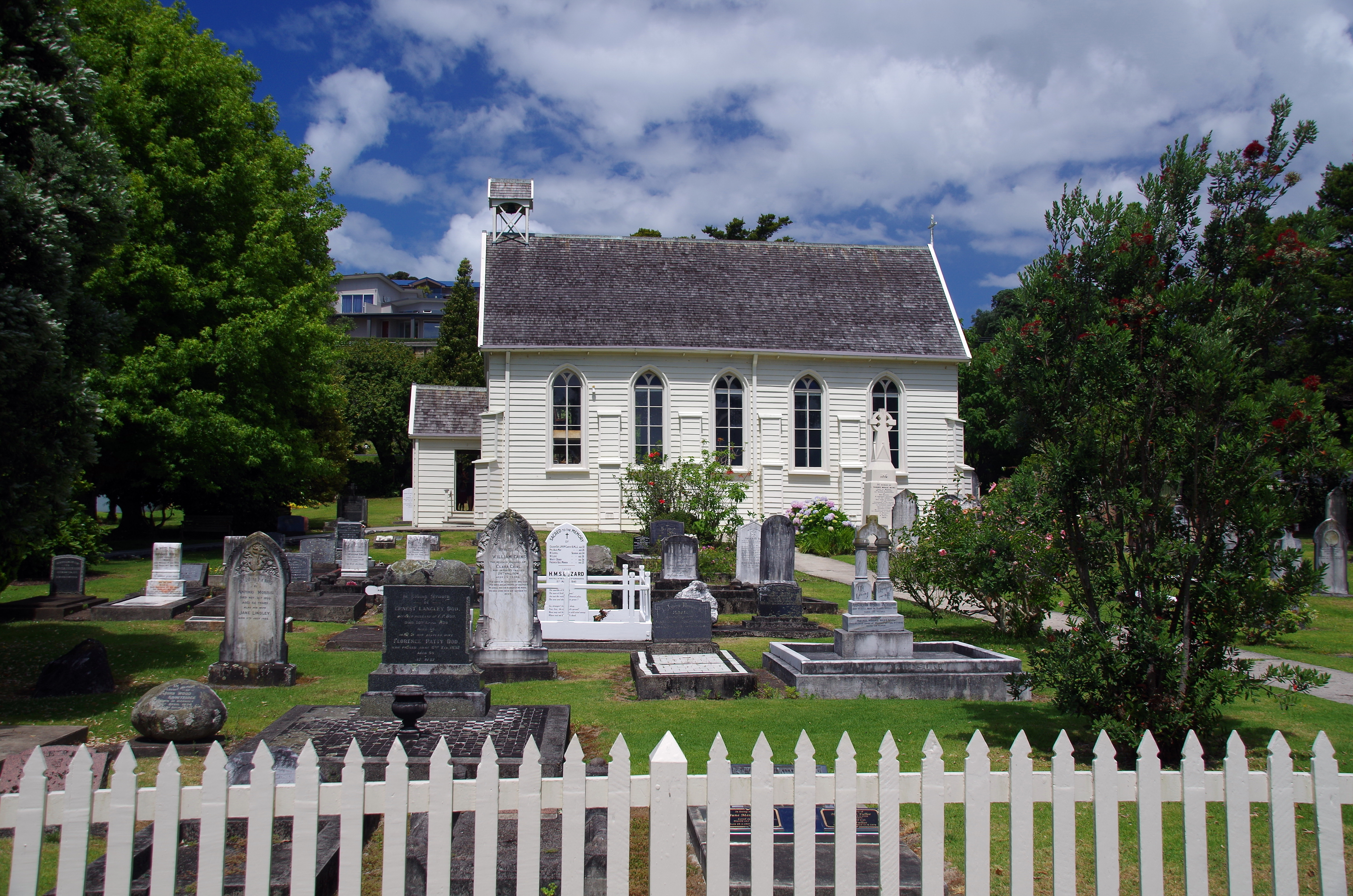
Christ Church, Russell. Burial place of Cmdr Charles Bell, and Hazard's battle casualties

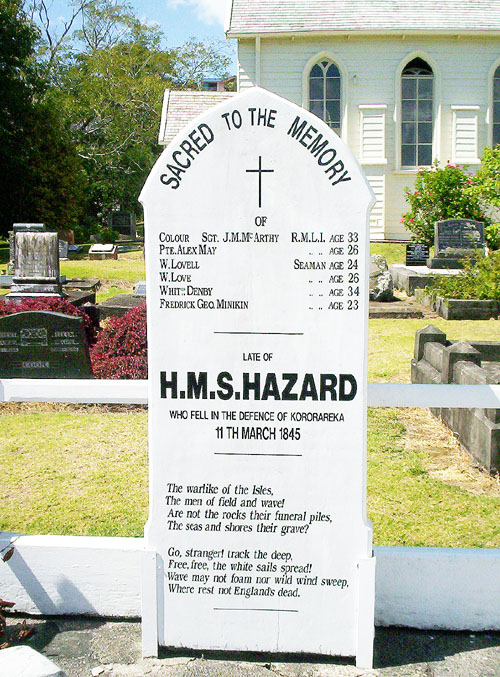
Memorial for Hazard's battle casualties at Christ Church, Russell

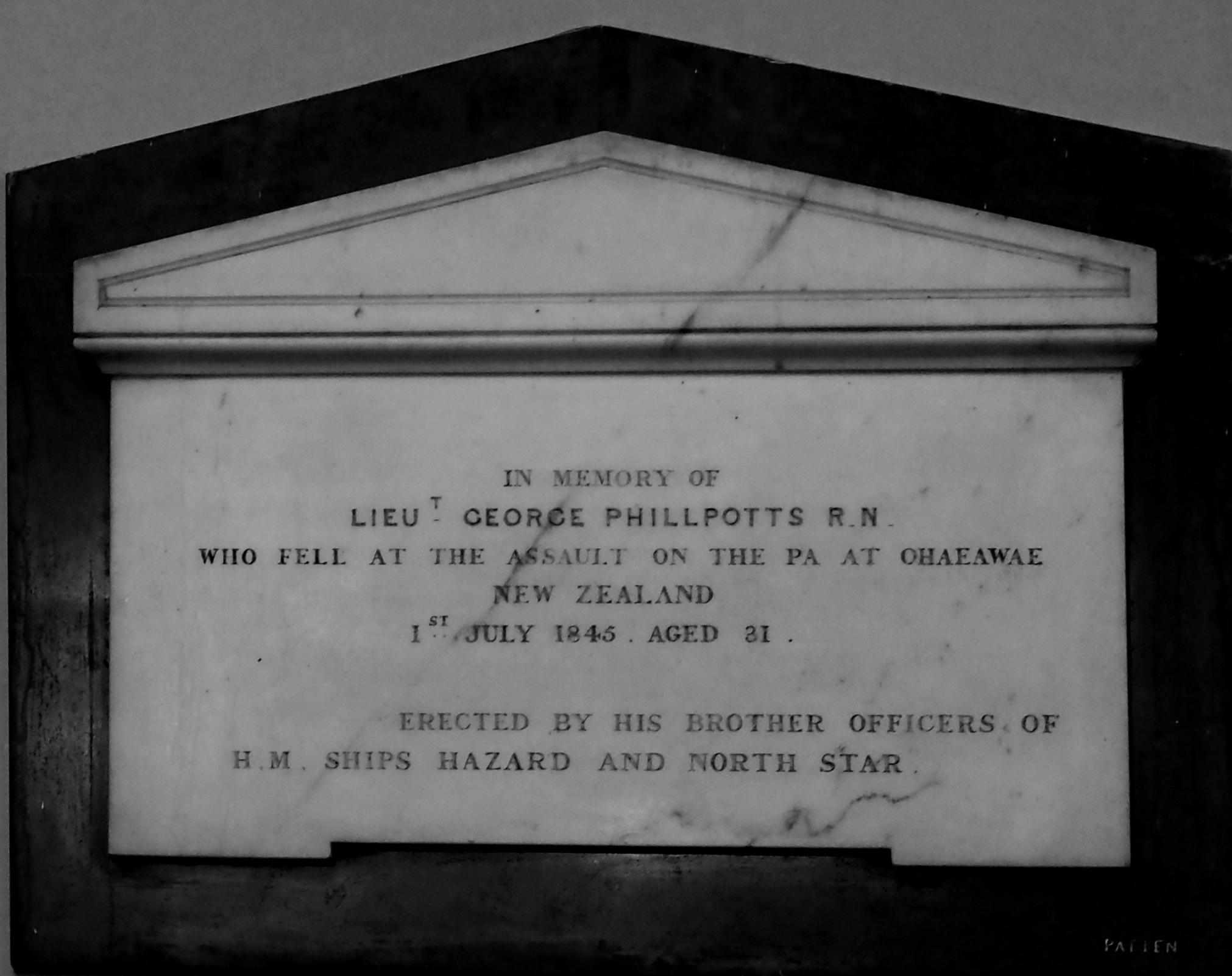
Memorial to Lt George Phillpotts in St James' Church, Sydney erected by his brother officers of the Hazard and North Star

=== Brunei ===
In April 1846 Hazard served in a squadron supporting Sir James Brooke (Raja Brooke of the Kingdom of Sarawak) in suppressing insurgency in the Sultanate of Brunei.

== Further service ==
She was reduced to 14 guns in 1848, and was eventually broken up at the yards of J. Samuel White, Cowes by 12 February 1866.

== Sources ==
- Colledge, J. J.; Warlow, Ben (2006) [1969]. Ships of the Royal Navy: The Complete Record of All Fighting Ships of the Royal Navy from the 15th Century to the Present (3rd Rev ed.). London: Chatham Publishing. ISBN 978-1-86176-281-8. OCLC 67375475.
- Lyon, David & Winfield, Rif (2004). The Sail and Steam Navy List: All the Ships of the Royal Navy 1815–1889. Chatham Publishing. ISBN 978-1-86176-032-6. OCLC 52620555.
