= Charles Baker (missionary) =

English missionary (1803–1875)

The Reverend Charles Baker
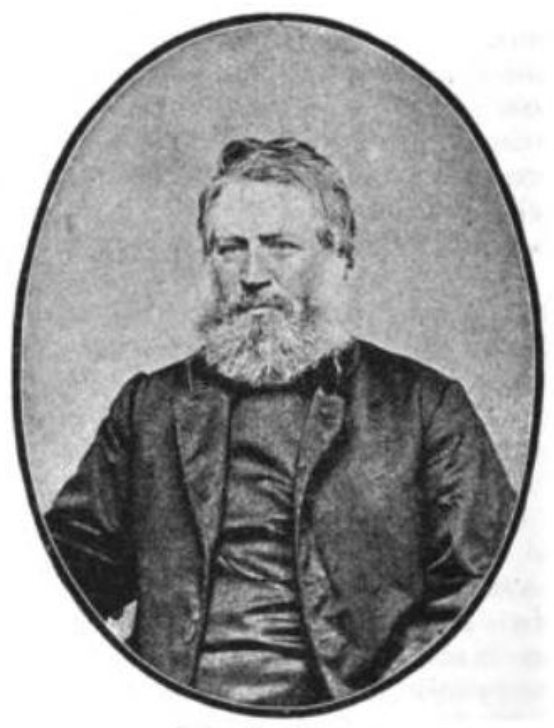
- Charles Baker
- Born: 5 August 1803; Packington, Leicestershire, England
- Died: 6 February 1875 (aged 71); Remuera, Auckland, New Zealand
- Education: Church Missionary Society College, Islington
- Occupation: Missionary
- Spouses: Sophia Riley (m. 1823; died 1826) Hannah Bailey (m. 1827)

Ecclesiastical career
- Religion: Christian (Anglican)
- Church: Church of England
- Ordained: 1860

Charles Frederick Baker (5 August 1803 – 6 February 1875) was an English member of the Church Missionary Society (CMS) active as a missionary in New Zealand in the 19th century. He supervised the construction of the historic church at Russell and was involved in the Treaty of Waitangi proceedings, a collection consisting of his journals and papers was added to the UNESCO Memory of the World New Zealand register in 2018.

== Biography ==
Baker was born on 5 August 1803 at Packington. After an education at the CMS College at Islington he left England in June 1827 arriving in the Bay of Islands, New Zealand in June 1828.

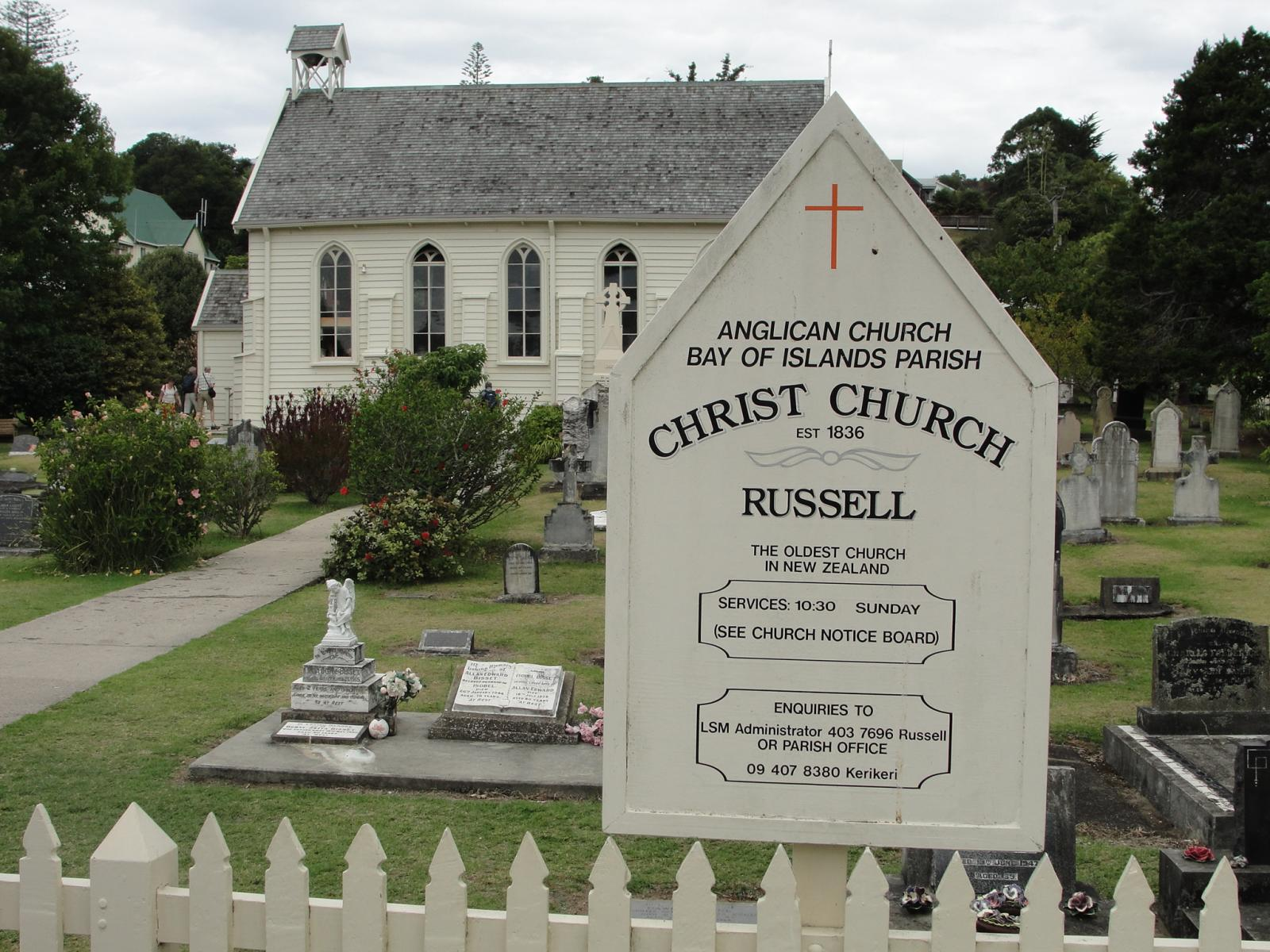
Christ Church, Russell

=== Early days at Paihia ===
Baker supervised the construction of Christ Church, Russell which, built in 1835 and 1836, is New Zealand's oldest surviving church. Charles Darwin along with Robert FitzRoy (later 2nd Governor of New Zealand) and the officers of HMS Beagle contributed £15 towards the construction. On Christmas day 1835 Darwin and FitzRoy attended a service held in Paihia by Baker, which FitzRoy records as being delivered in both English and Māori. FitzRoy remarked on Baker's seemingly fluent Māori, however, was critical of Baker's mixed delivery given the congregation consisted of predominantly European settlers.

=== Treaty of Waitangi ===
In 1840, as a result of the absence of Henry Williams, Baker was responsible for overseeing the CMS Paihia headquarters. He was involved in the preparations for the Treaty of Waitangi and was present at the signing.

On 29 January William Hobson arrived in the Bay of Islands aboard HMS Herald, Baker along with British Resident James Busby met Hobson aboard the ship. After having left the Herald, Baker received two letters from Hobson. The first, requested Baker have invitations for a meeting printed and sent expeditiously to the Maori chiefs; it was at this meeting the following week that the Treaty of Waitangi was signed. In the second, Hobson requested to use Baker's church at Russell (then called Kororāreka) the following day to read his Proclamations. He also asks Baker to have drafts of the Proclamations printed, and that Baker use his influence to ensure attendance of the reading of the Proclamations. The invitations and the Proclamations would be printed that night in the printing press located in a semi-detached wing in Baker's house by William Colenso. The following day, Baker witnessed Hobson's Proclamations at Christ Church, Russell.

On 6 February 1840 Baker was present at the signing of the Treaty of Waitangi. According to Colenso's 1890 account, Baker was challenged by the chief Moka regarding land holdings. Moka first addressed William Hobson in Māori, with Henry Williams acting as an interpreter, before addressing Baker directly. Moka's remarks (translated into English) are given by Colenso as follows:

Moka rejoined, " That is good, O Governor! that is straight. But stay, let me see. Yes, yes, indeed! Where is Baker? where is the fellow? Ah, there he is – there, standing! Come, return to me my lands." This he addressed to Mr. Baker, coming forward as near as he could to the place where Mr. Baker was standing on the raised platform, and looking up, waiting for a reply. To which question Mr. Baker quietly replied, " E hoki, koia?" – equivalent in English to, "Will it, indeed, return?" On which Moka continued, " There! Yes, that is as I said. No, no, no; all false, all false alike. The lands will not return to me." (Note: Lindsay Buick translates Baker's reply as "We shall see whether they will return.")

Colenso then describes how, prompted by this dialogue, James Busby and Henry Williams successively made statements in English defending their respective land holdings. He claims Tamati Pukututu, chief of the Te Uri-o-te-hawato tribe (a sub-tribe (Hapū) of the Ngāpuhi tribe), also spoke in defence of the missionaries and chastised Moka, and several of his fellow chieftains, for having sold their land in return for foreign goods.

While the veracity of Colenso's account of the treaty has been questioned, it remains a seminal account of the treaty proceedings. Colenso's relationship with his fellow CMS missionaries, in particular Baker, had deteriorated in 1852 following the revelation of Colenso's affair with his servant Rīpeka.

=== Tolaga Bay and Rangitukia ===
In January 1843 Baker moved to Tolaga Bay to establish a mission station there. While at Tolaga Bay Baker benefited significantly from the support and protection of important chief Te Kani-a-Takirau. In 2007 the remains of buildings that were part of the mission station, and over 40 graves were unearthed. In 1851 Baker left Tolaga Bay to seek treatment for rheumatism at Auckland.

In 1854, sufficiently recovered from his period of ill health, Baker left Auckland to take charge of the Rangitukia mission station. There Baker was responsible for supervising the construction of a sequence of churches, notably St John’s Church at Rangitukia (1854–56). Baker had a significant impact on the 1950s style of church architecture in the East Coast area. The construction of St John's Church was documented by Baker's son Joseph Goadby Baker, who described it as capable of supporting a Māori congregation of around 2000. The opening was attended by the Bishop George Selwyn, who estimated that in excess of 3000 Māori attended the opening. In his journals, Baker recorded the impacts of a measles outbreak at Rangitukia in 1954. His assistant Pita Whakangaua died as a result of the same disease the following year.

=== Later life and death ===
He was appointed as a deacon in 1853, and in 1860 ordained priest. He retired to Auckland in 1865 where, until his health deteriorated, he was active preaching; regularly visiting the stockades and the hospital. Baker died on 6 February 1875 after a period of illness and is buried at St Stephen's Churchyard, Parnell, Auckland.

== Marriages and issue ==
Baker married firstly Sophia Riley (died 1826) by whom he had one child Dorcas Sophia Baker (1824–1875), who married Native Land Court Judge Thomas Henry Smith.

Baker married secondly Hannah Maria Bailey, daughter of William Bailey and Hannah Goadby, on 11 June 1827 by whom he had 13 children including:

- William Bailey Baker (1828–1865), resident Magistrate for Waiapū and civil servant. He served as Chief Translator to H.M. forces at Tauranga during the New Zealand Wars, and as resident magistrate there also . He produced a range of ethological works on Māori language and culture, and is also remembered for his first-hand account of the Treaty of Waitangi.
- Charles Pratt Baker (1829–1862), appointed Resident Magistrate for Tolaga Bay (Uawa) but died in the sinking of the Pole Star before taking up the post.
- Ebenezer Baker (1830–1905), resident Magistrate for Wairoa.
- Hannah Maria Baker (1831–1868)
- Charlotte Baker (1833–1838)
- Anne Gunn (1835–1918)
- Samuel Marsden Baker (1837–1915), civil servant and first interpreter to the New Zealand Legislative Council.
- Rev. Frederick Thomas Baker (1839–1896), married Emily Elizabeth Larkins daughter of the Rev. Frederick Larkins. Attended St John's College, Auckland 1871 – 1873, and was ordained priest in 1875.
- Joseph Goadby Baker (1840–1924)
- Mary Eliza King (1841–1860)
- Henry Williams Baker (1843–1927)
- Charlotte Elizabeth Baker (1844–1866)

== Legacy ==
In 2018 Baker's journals and papers were added to the UNESCO Memory of the World Aotearoa New Zealand Ngā Mahara o te Ao register, which recognises heritage items of national significance. The collection is currently held at the Auckland War Memorial Museum.
