= Pompallier House =

Historic building in Northland, New Zealand

Coordinates: 35.2646°S 174.1220°E

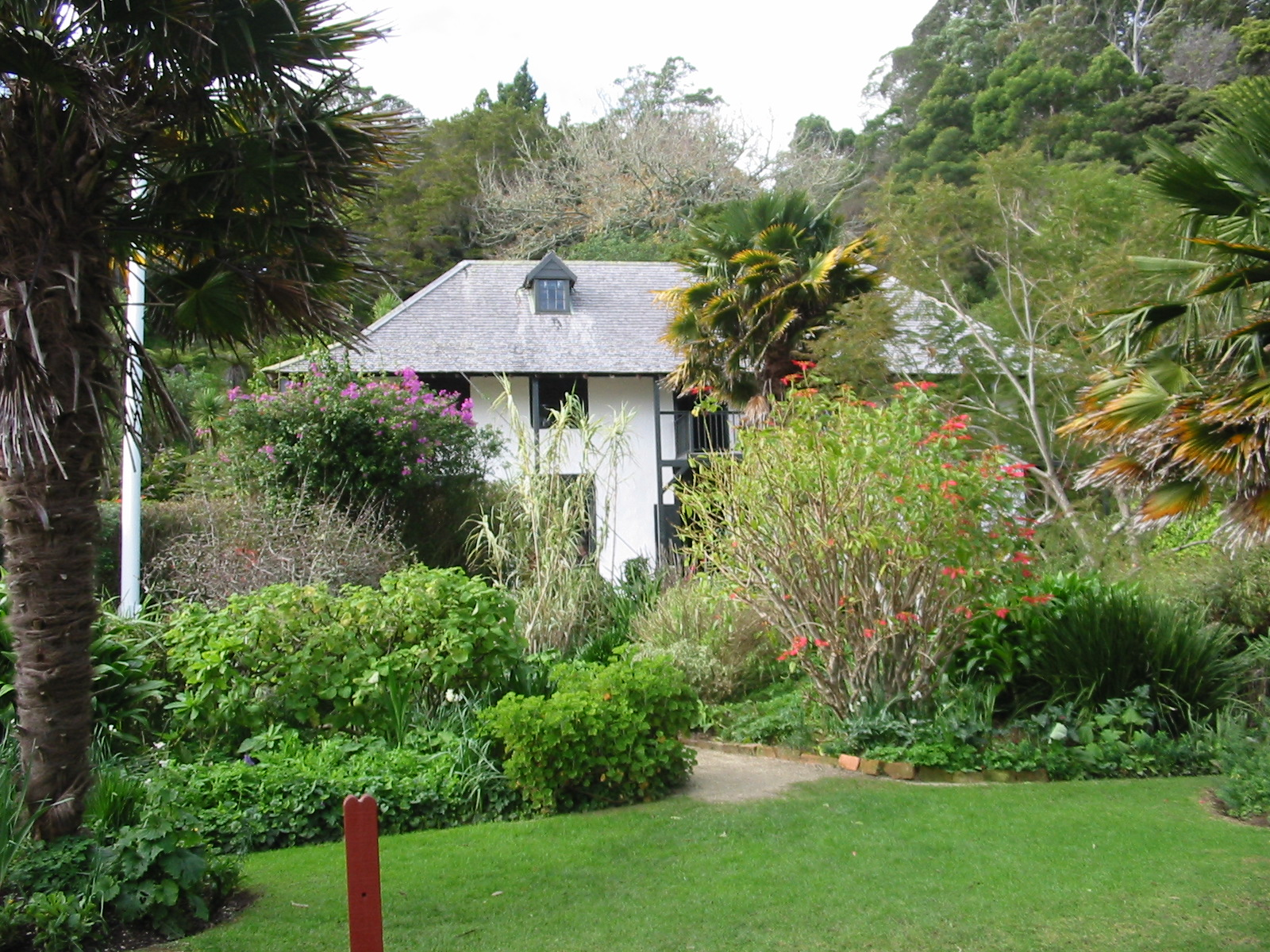
Pompallier House and gardens.

Pompallier House, also known as Pompallier Mission, is a nineteenth-century building located in Russell, New Zealand which once served as the headquarters to the French Catholic mission to the Western Pacific. It is named after Jean-Baptiste Pompallier, the first vicar apostolic to visit New Zealand, who founded a number of missions in the North Island. Pompallier House is owned and managed by Heritage New Zealand, who open it to the public. It is New Zealand's oldest Roman Catholic building, oldest rammed earth building, and oldest industrial building.

== Description ==
Pompallier House is a vernacular two-storeyed building. The lower storey is constructed from rammed earth with the upper-storey being timber framed. The roof is hipped. The exterior is coated with limewash.

The Pompallier House Historic Reserve totals 1.8 ha (4.4 acres) and includes the grounds of the mission, Clendon Cottage.

== History ==
=== Construction ===
In 1836 Bishop Jean-Baptiste Pompallier, along with the newly formed French order the Society of Mary (or Marists) received papal approval and were given the mission of Western Oceania. In 1838 Pompallier arrived at the Hokianga, on the North Island of New Zealand. Joined by other members of the order, Pompallier and the mission moved to the Bay of Islands to set up their headquarters in Kororareka (now Russell).

Bishop Pompallier bought land in Russell in 1839 and the building was constructed in 1841–2. Louis Perret oversaw the construction, as he was the most qualified having studied architecture in Rome. In 1842 it produced its first Māori translations of religious texts.

Unable to bear the cost of purchasing much timber, the missionaries used the rammed earth construction common in Lyon, their original home. The earth was dug on site and supplemented with sand and rocks from the nearby beaches. Lime was made by burning shells. The upper floor was constructed with earth supported by timber frames. The work was supervised by architect Louis Perret.

There were a number of other buildings on the site, including a chapel, houses, kitchens and other outhouses, but the "Pompallier House" is the only one remaining.

=== Printing press ===
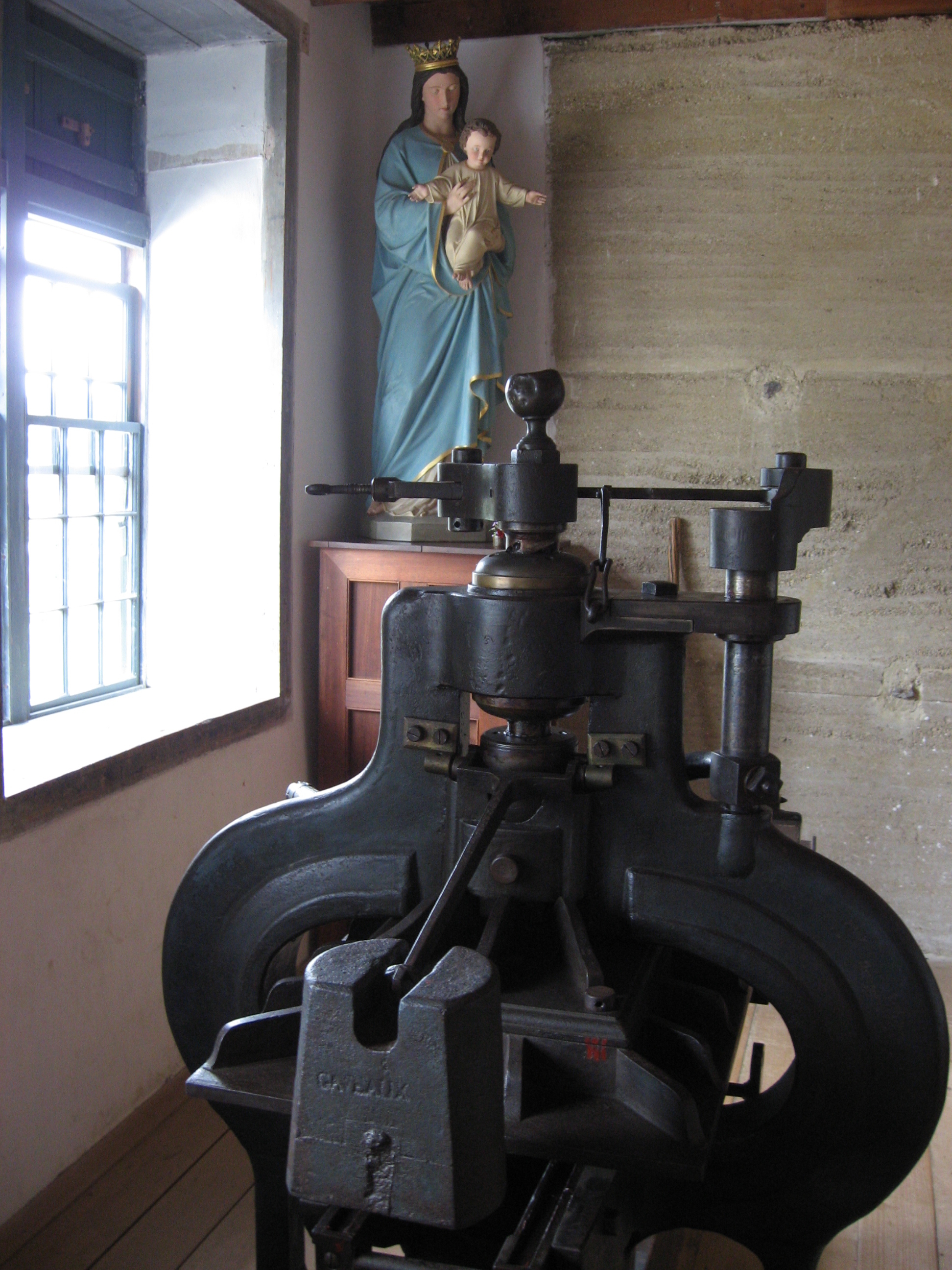
The Gaveaux printing press in the Pompallier House

The original Gaveaux printing press was brought to the mission from France in the early 1840s; between 1842 and 1849 it printed over 30,000 books and tracts, some of the first in Māori. After the mission left Russell in 1850 the press was amongst the belongings redistributed. In 1857 the Waikato Māori asked for the press, which was given to them by Bishop Pompallier. The press was used by Tāwhiao, the Māori King to print the Māori-language newspaper Te Paki o Matariki. The press remained in Waikato until the 1990s when it was returned to Pompallier House by the Māori Queen Te Atairangikaahu.

While the building was originally built for a printery, it also housed a tannery for book-binding.

=== Relocation of missionary ===
In 1850 the mission headquarters moved to Auckland, and in 1856 James Callaghan took over the building, converting it to a residence known as "Callaghan's Castle". The Greenway family purchased the property and in the late 1870s demolished the outbuildings and established a grand garden around the main building, which was converted into a house. until the Government purchased the building in 1941. Pompallier House served as accommodation for military officers based in Russell during the Second World War. After the war the building was restored by the Ministry of Works. Due to the alterations carried out by the Greenway family the property was mistakenly believed to have been the residence of Bishop Pompallier and the original restoration was based around this misconception.

== Legacy ==
In the 1990s further restoration was carried out that accurately reflected the nature of the building as a mission, printery, and tannery. The building contains the original printing press, restored to working order, and the gardens remain as an example of the Victorian and Edwardian gardens typical of the latter owners.

Pompallier House is the oldest building associated with Catholicism in New Zealand and is the second oldest building in Russell.

Pompallier House is registered as a category 1 building with Heritage New Zealand, who also own and manage the property.

== See also ==
- Christ Church, Russell — oldest extant church in New Zealand and the oldest building in Russell.
