= Battle of Kororāreka =

1845 Flagstaff War battle in New Zealand

- Part of the Flagstaff War
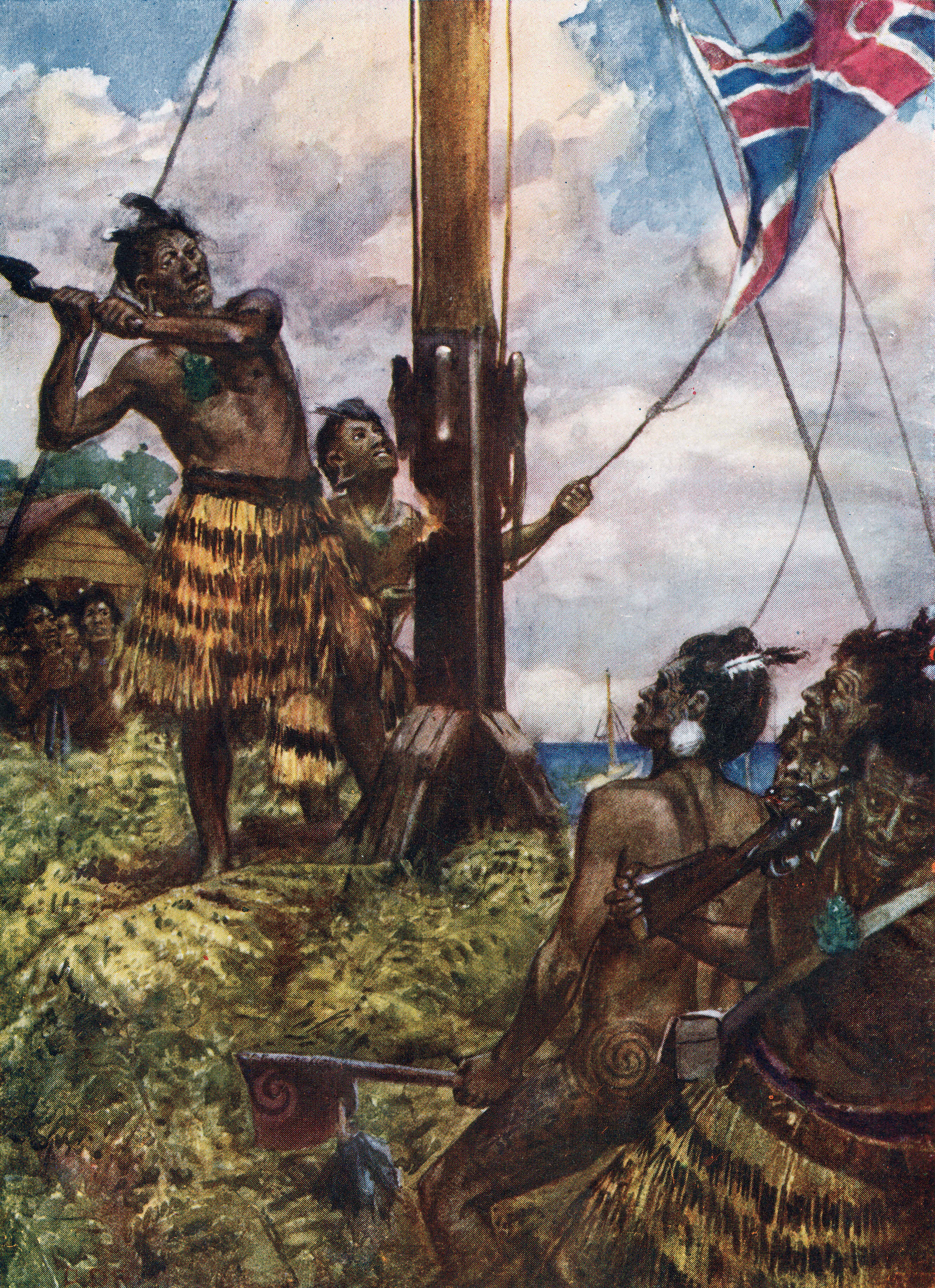
- Hōne Heke removing the British colors from Flagstaff Hill in Kororāreka
| Date | 11 March 1845 |
| Location | Kororāreka / Russell, Bay of Islands, New Zealand 35°15′17.7″S 174°07′11.9″E |
| Result | Māori victory |

Belligerents
| (United Kingdom of Great Britain and Ireland) Col. of New Zealand | Rebel Māori |

Commanders and leaders
| (United Kingdom of Great Britain and Ireland) David Robertson-Macdonald (WIA) (United Kingdom of Great Britain and Ireland) George Phillpotts (United Kingdom of Great Britain and Ireland) Edward Barclay (United Kingdom of Great Britain and Ireland) John Campbell; Cornthwaite Hector | Hōne Heke; Te Ruki Kawiti; Pūmuka † |

Units involved
| (United Kingdom of Great Britain and Ireland) Royal Navy: HMS Hazard; Royal Marines; (United Kingdom of Great Britain and Ireland) British Army: 96th Regiment; Civil volunteers: Civic Guard | Taua: Hōne Heke; Te Ruki Kawiti; Pūmuka |

Strength
| ~90 sailors & marines ~52 soldiers ~70 armed civilians | ~600 warriors |

Casualties and losses
| Military (11 March); 11 killed ~22 wounded Civil (11-17 March); ~13 killed >13 wounded | ~34 killed Unknown wounded |
- Kororāreka / Russell, Bay of Islands, New Zealand

The Battle of Kororāreka, or the Burning of Kororāreka, on 11 March 1845, was an engagement of the Flagstaff War in New Zealand. Following the establishment of British control of the islands, war broke out with a small group of the native population which resulted in the fall of the town of Kororāreka, present day Russell, to Māori warriors.

== Background ==
Although he had been the first to sign the Treaty of Waitangi in February 1840, Ngāpuhi chief Hōne Heke became increasingly unhappy with the outcome. He objected to the relocation of the capital to Auckland and changes to custom tariffs that caused a serious loss of revenue to the Ngāpuhi.

In July 1844, Heke and a group of warriors entered the town, and the Pakaraka chief Te Haratua cut down the flagstaff. Heke himself had set out to cut down the flagstaff, but had been persuaded by Archdeacon William Williams not to do so. Six months later on 10 January 1845 the flagstaff was cut down a second time - this time by Heke. A new and stronger flagstaff sheathed in iron was erected later that month and a guard post built around it - but the next morning the flagstaff was felled for the third time.

Governor FitzRoy sent over to New South Wales for reinforcements. A block-house and ditch, designed by Captain George Augustus Bennett, RE, was built at the base of the flagstaff, a guard of 20 soldiers was placed in this, and a fourth flagstaff erected.

== Battle ==
On 11 March 1845 Hōne Heke and his men, along with Te Ruki Kawiti and his followers, attacked the town.

British forces were outnumbered. HM Sloop Hazard landed a party to aid the detachment of 96th Regiment commanded by Lieutenant Edward Barclay. In all there were about 140 soldiers, sailors and marines. The American sloop USS St. Louis, under Captain Isaac McKeever, USN, was also present and her crew assisted in evacuating the British subjects.

Heavy skirmishing lasted for a while until a large explosion destroyed all of the defender's reserve ammunition. The explosion also set a building on fire which spread. At about that time the British had begun to withdraw to the safety of the ships anchored in the bay and evacuate the civilian population. HMS Hazard then bombarded Māori positions.

On the day, ten military defenders and three civilians were killed in action or died of wounds. At least thirty-six were variously wounded. The town was mostly destroyed after evacuation and over the following days.

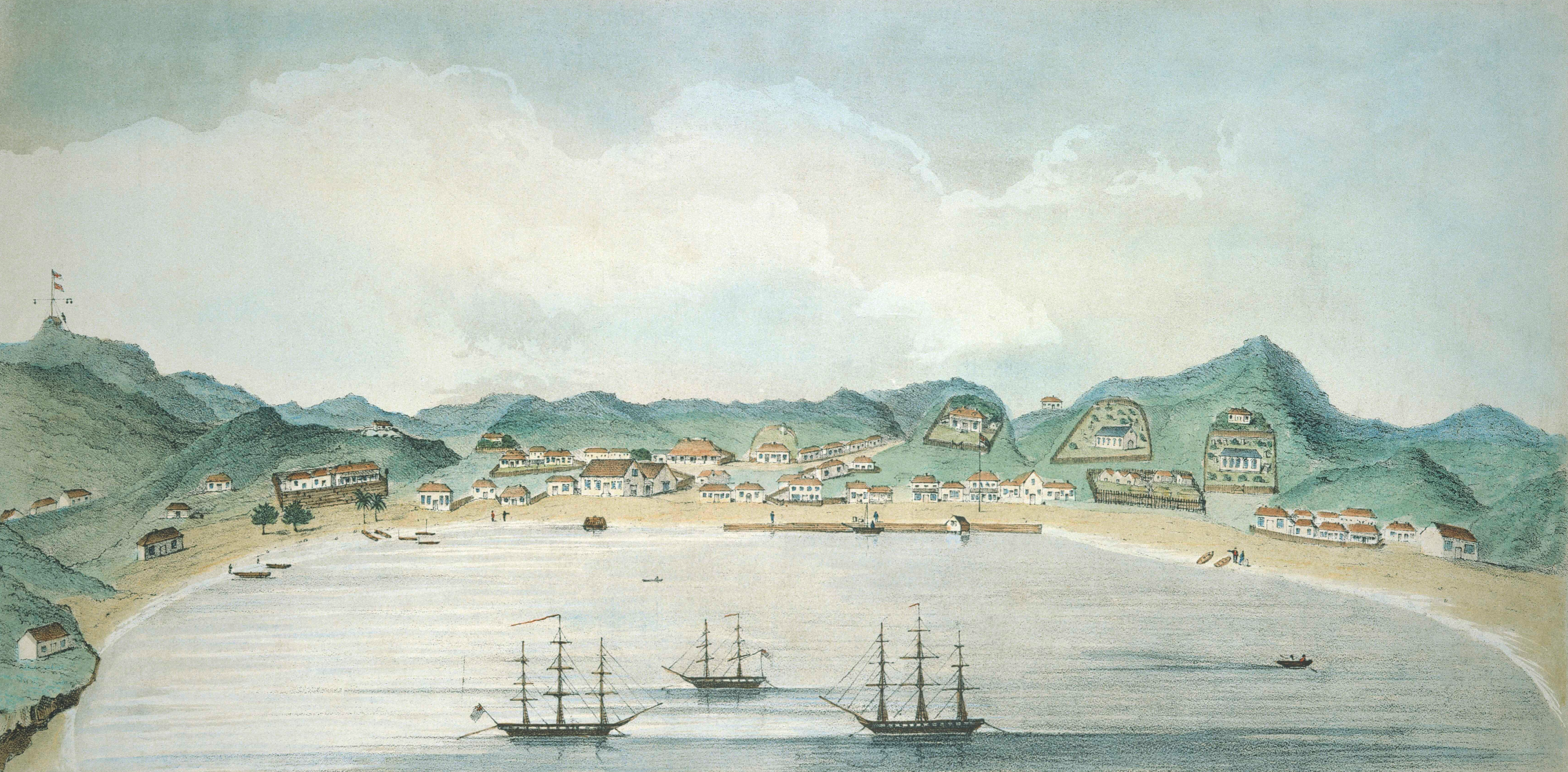
Kororāreka (Russell) before the battle, 10 March 1845

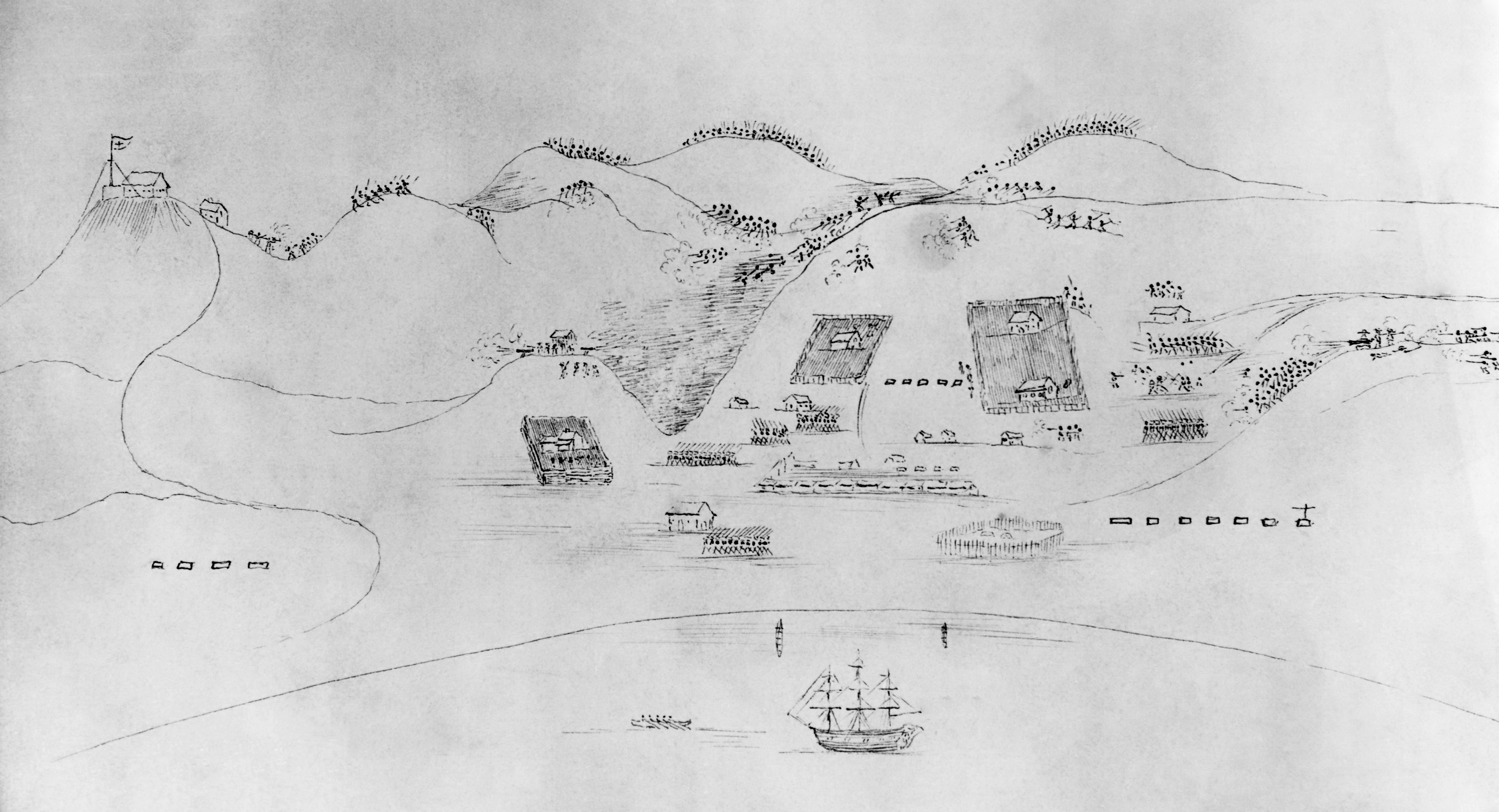
Kororāreka (Russell) during the battle, 11 March 1845

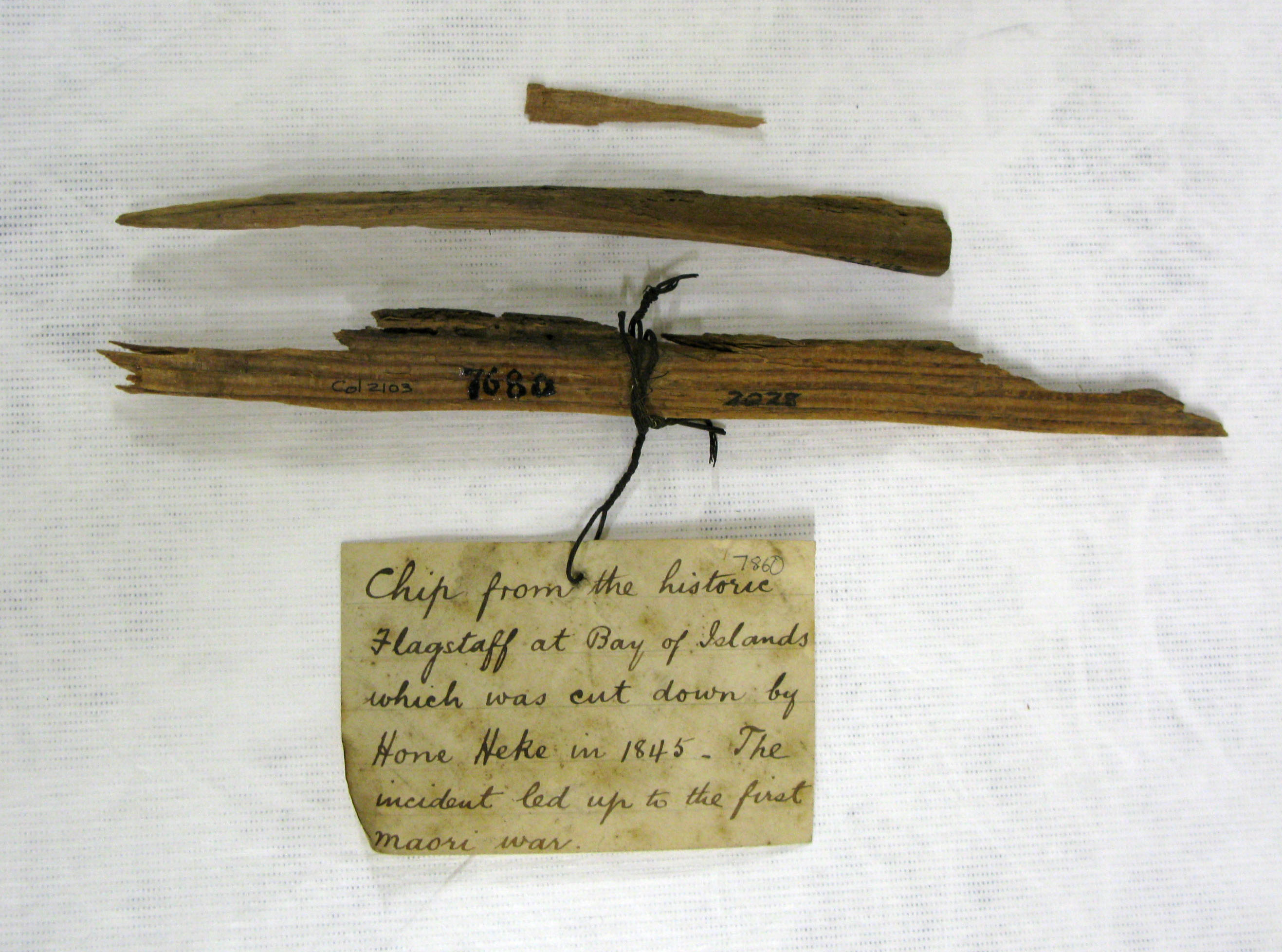
Wood fragments said to be from the flagstaff cut down by Hōne Heke. Auckland War Memorial Museum

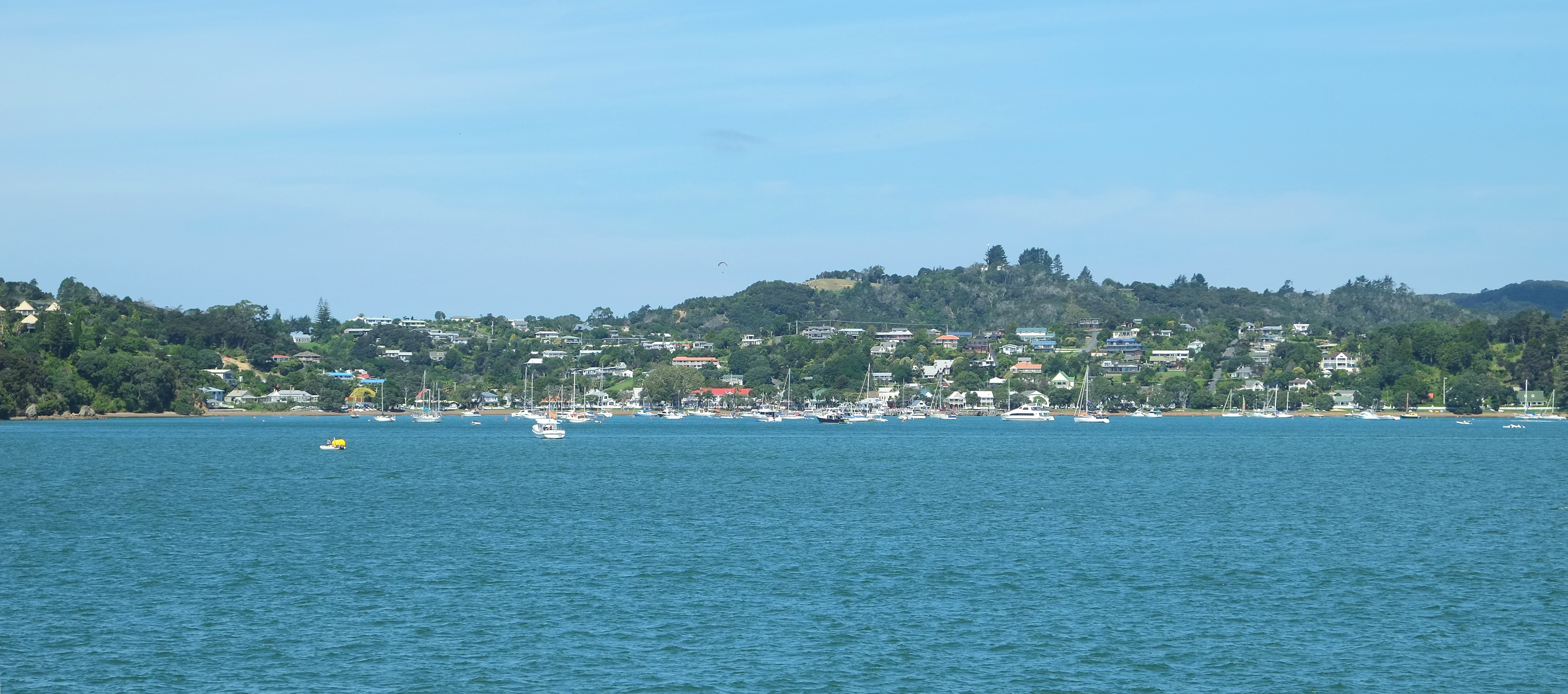
Russell (Kororāreka) from the bay, 24 January 2018

Killed in Action and Died of Wounds
| Māori | Name and Identity | Action | Buried | Ref |
|---|---|---|---|---|
| | Pūmuka. Rangatira, Ngāpuhi, Te Roroa, Ngāti Rangi, Ngāti Pou | Matavia Pass | | |
| | Hirawanu | | | |
| | Kereopa | | | |
| | About 31 unidentified | | | |
| Military | | | | |
| Royal Navy | James McCarthy. Colour-Sergeant, Royal Marines, HMS Hazard | Matavia Pass | Christ Church, Kororāreka, 11 March | |
| | Alexander May. Private, Royal Marines, HMS Hazard | Matavia Pass | Christ Church, Kororāreka, 11 March | |
| | Whitaker Denby. Seaman, HMS Hazard | Matavia Pass | Christ Church, Kororāreka, 11 March | |
| | William Love. Seaman, HMS Hazard | Matavia Pass | Christ Church, Kororāreka, 11 March | |
| | William Lovell. Seaman, HMS Hazard | One Gun Battery, Matavia Pass | Christ Church, Kororāreka, 11 March | |
| | Frederick George Minikin. Seaman, HMS Hazard | Matavia Pass | Christ Church, Kororāreka, 11 March | |
| British Army | William Giddens. Private, 96th Regiment of Foot | Flagstaff Blockhouse | St Paul's Church, Paihia, 12 March | |
| | Henry Ireson. Private, 96th Regiment | Flagstaff Blockhouse | St Paul's Church, Paihia, 12 March | |
| | George Jackson. Private, 96th Regiment | Flagstaff Blockhouse | St Paul's Church, Paihia, 12 March | |
| | William Miller. Private, 96th Regiment | Flagstaff Blockhouse | St Paul's Church, Paihia, 12 March | |
| | James Duross. Private, 96th Regiment | Lower Blockhouse. Severe head wound. Died, Auckland, 3 April | | |
| Civil | | | | |
| Government | John Thompson. Seaman, HM Colonial Brig Victoria; Police boatman | Stockade explosion. Burns Died, HMS Hazard, 14 March | At sea, 14 March | |
| | Unidentified. Seaman, HM Colonial Brig Victoria. Possibly John Pierpoint | GSW to forehead. Possibly Pierpont, died, Auckland, 23 March | Symonds Street Cemetery, Auckland, 25 March | |
| Civilian | Henry Torre. Commander, schooner Dolphin; solicitor | Stockade explosion. Burns Died, HMS Hazard, 12 March | St Paul's Church, Paihia, 12 March | |
| | Fanny Wing. Daughter of Rautangi and Thomas Wing | Flagstaff Blockhouse | St Paul's Church, Paihia, 12 March | |
| | 9 unidentified | Post-battle spoils. Some bodies burnt, 11–17 March | Christ Church, Kororāreka, 11–17 March 1845 | |

== Memorial ==
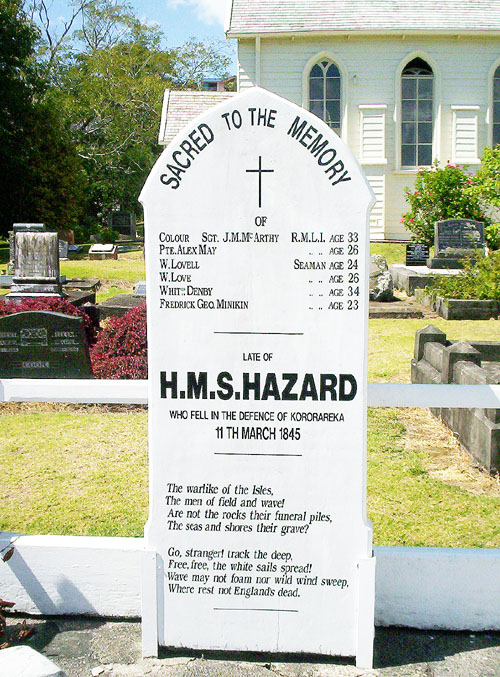
A memorial in Russell for the men of HMS Hazard who died in the battle

Six men from the Hazard who died in the action are remembered by a grave marker at Christ Church, Russell. The last two verses of the poem England's Dead by Felicia Hemans are inscribed on the marker in memory of them:

The warlike of the isles,
The men of field and wave!
Are not the rocks their funeral piles,
The seas and shores their grave?

Go, stranger! track the deep,
Free, free the white sail spread!
Wave may not foam, nor wild wind sweep,
Where rest not England's dead.

Variation in the verses appear in visitor observations and through marker restoration since 1845.

== See also ==
- New Zealand Wars
