= Eagles Nest, New Zealand =

Coordinates: 35.252975°S 174.116634°E

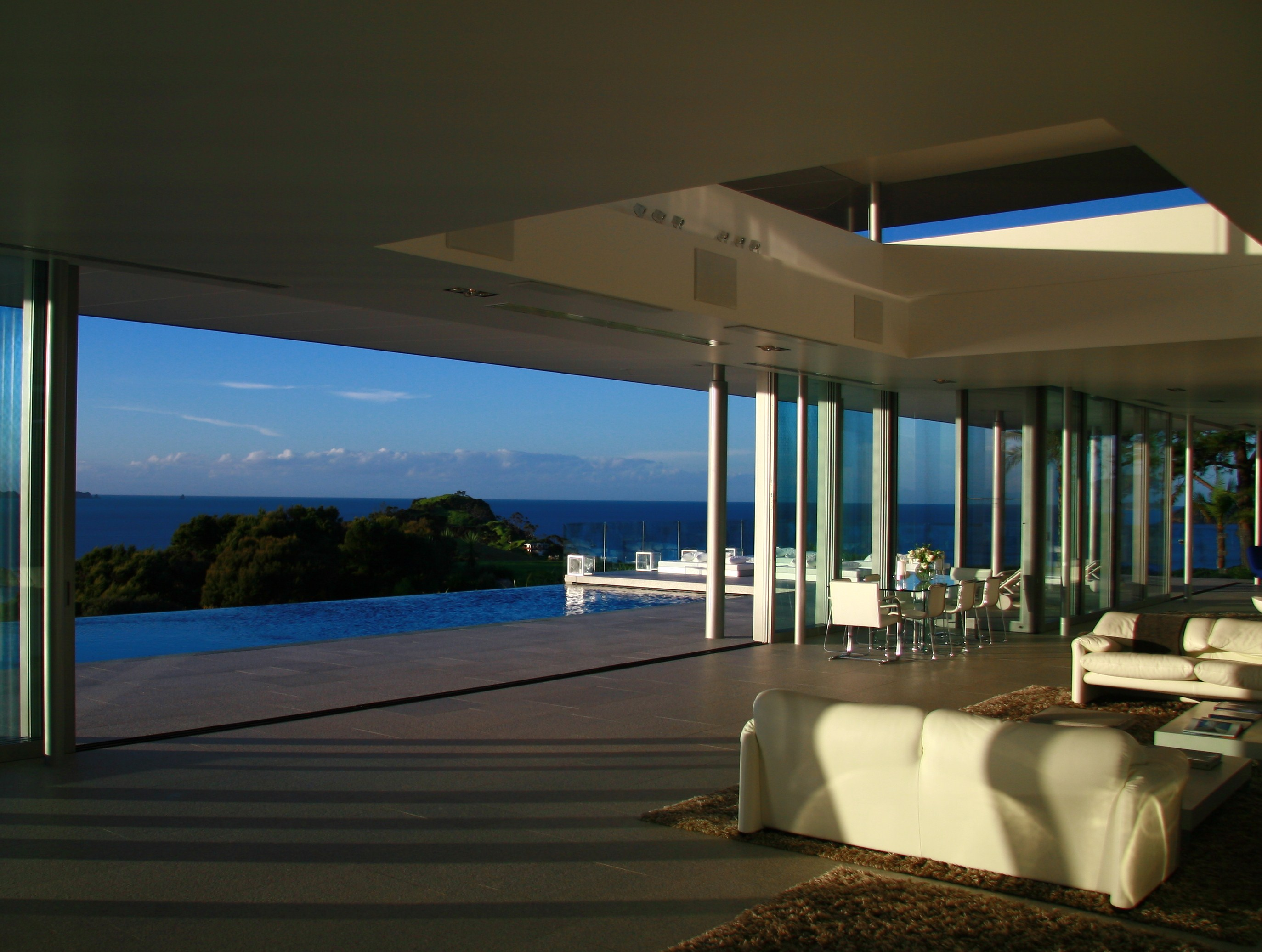
View From the Main villa, Rahimoana.

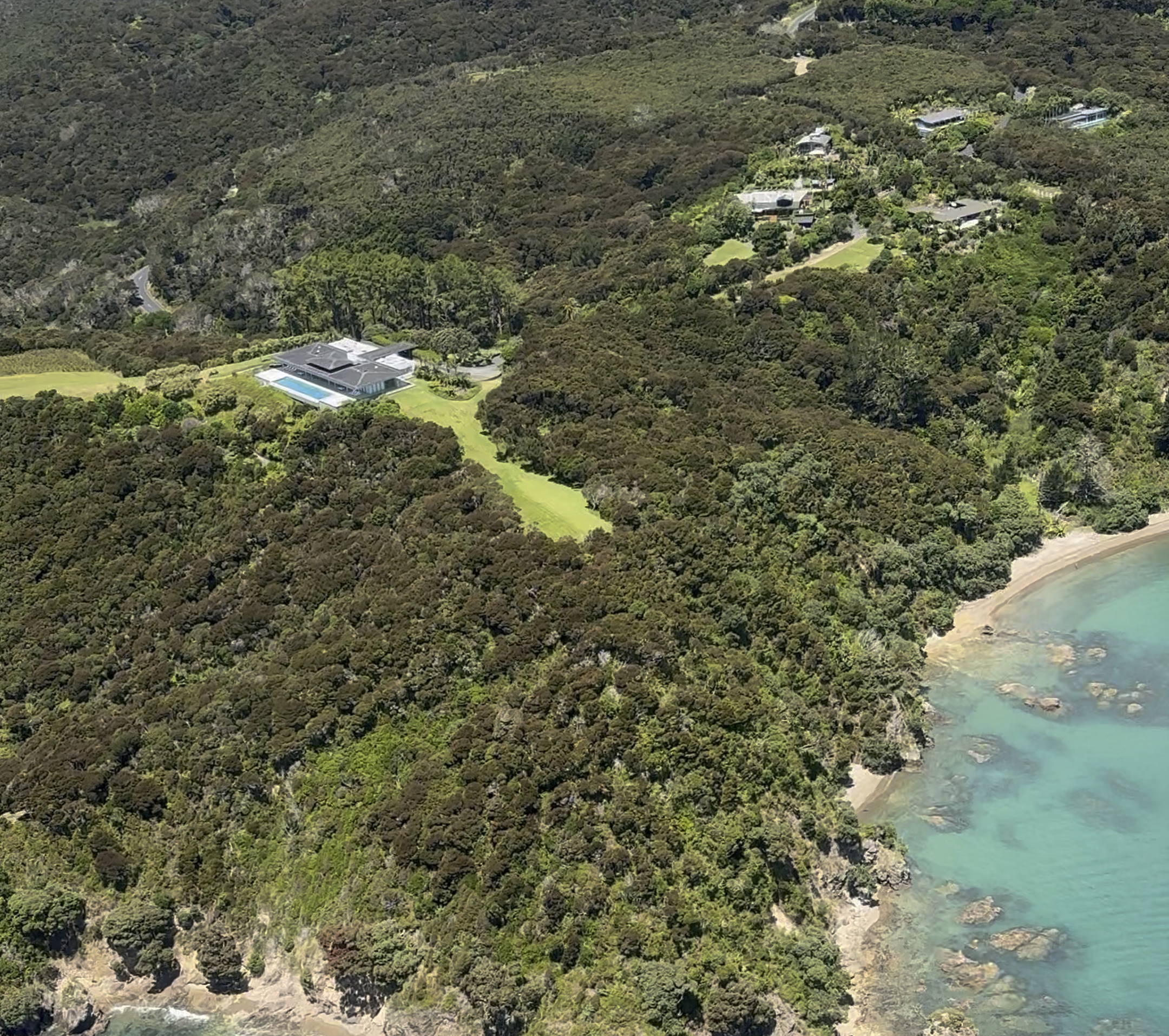
Eagles Nest villas, from left: Rahimoana (Main villa), Sacred Space, First light, Eyrie (Top building) and Eagle Spirit

The Eagles Nest is a complex of five rental villas in the Bay of Islands of New Zealand, a few kilometres north of Russell. Located on a headland above the sea with good views of the bay, the secured compound is the most expensive rental accommodation of New Zealand, with a single night costing up to a five-figure sum in New Zealand $ (as of the mid-2000s), depending which of the villas are chosen. Guests are also provided with amenities like personal chefs and Porsche cars.

The 5-Star rated Eagles Nest has been awarded the "World Travel Award" for "New Zealand's Leading Resort" and is one of Conde Nast's Top 10 Spas in Australia and South Pacific. It was also featured on The Great Outdoors TV show.
