= Russell, New Zealand =

Town in the Northland Region of New Zealand

Russell Kororāreka
- Town
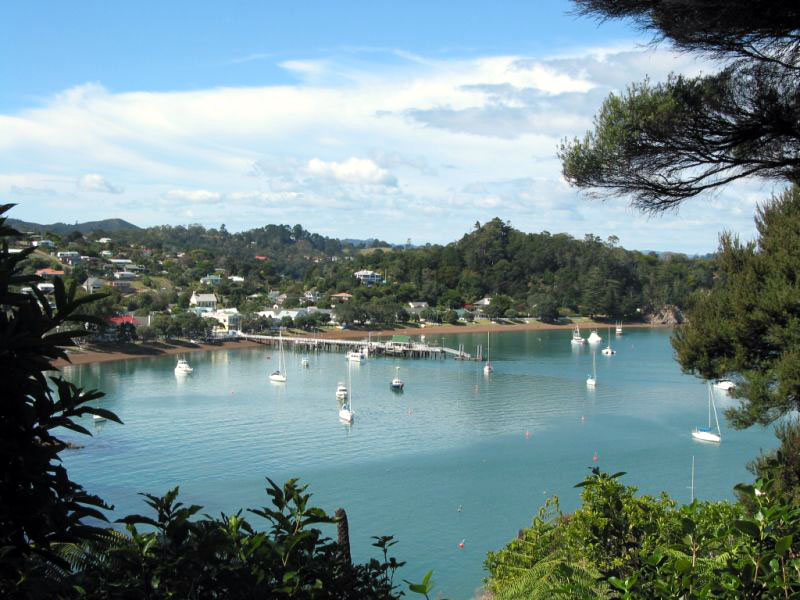
- Russell
- Interactive map of Russell
- Coordinates: 35°15′42″S 174°7′20″E
- Country: New Zealand
- Region: Northland Region
- District: Far North District
- Ward: Bay of Islands-Whangaroa
- Community: Bay of Islands-Whangaroa
- Subdivision: Russell-Ōpua
- Settled: Early 19th century
- Named for: John Russell, Secretary of State for the Colonies
- Electorates: Northland; Te Tai Tokerau

Government
  - Territorial Authority: Far North District Council
  - Regional council: Northland Regional Council
  - Mayor of the Far North: Moko Tepania
  - Northland MP: Grant McCallum
  - Te Tai Tokerau MP: TBD

Area
  - Total: 3.28 km^{2} (1.27 sq mi)

Population (June 2025)
  - Total: 820
  - Density: 250/km^{2} (650/sq mi)
- Postcode: 0202

Russell (Māori: Kororāreka), originally known as Kororāreka is a town in the Bay of Islands, in New Zealand's far north. It was one of the first European settlements in New Zealand.

== History ==
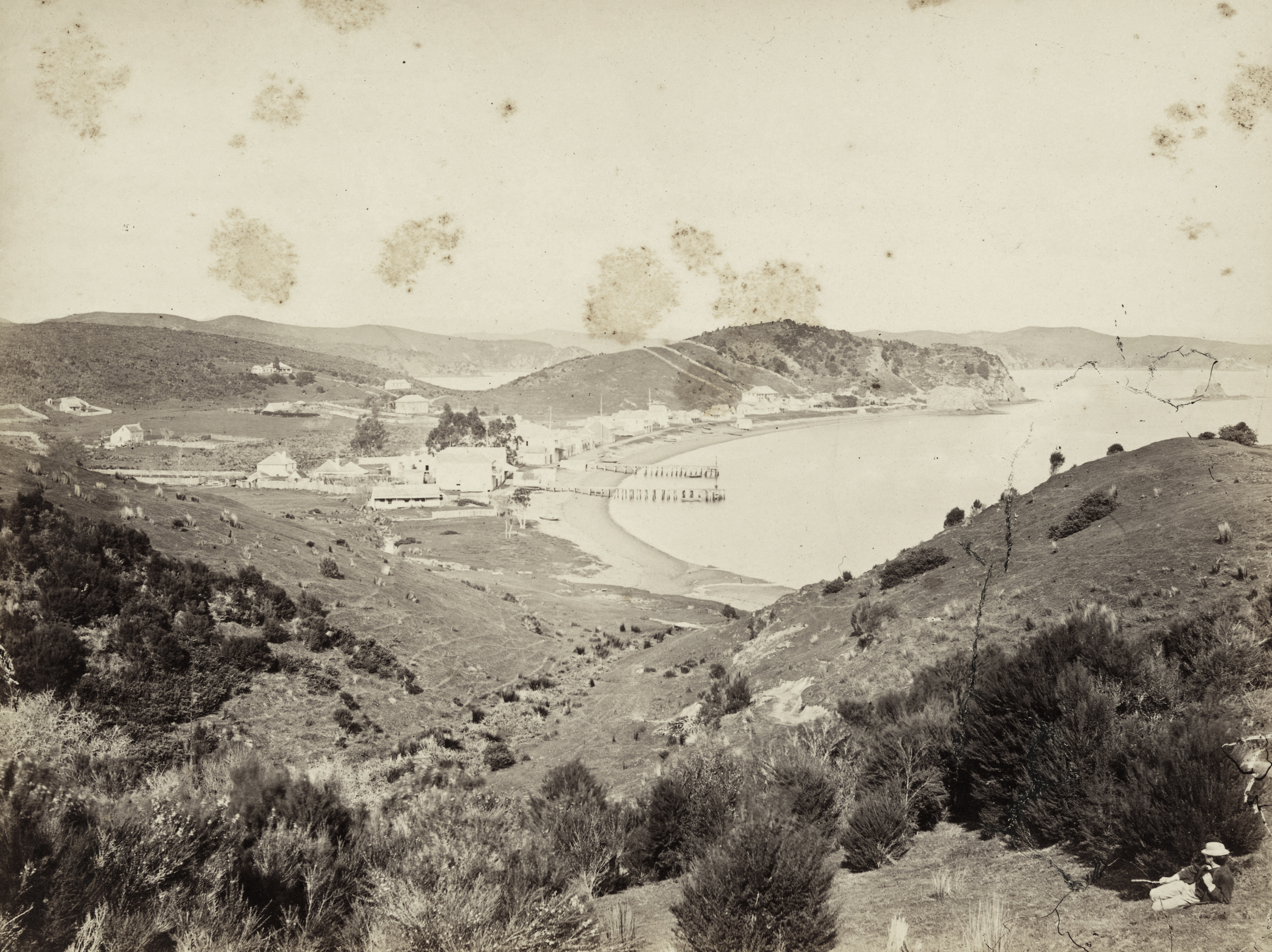
Russell from Flag Staff Hill, Bay of Islands, New Zealand, c. 1870

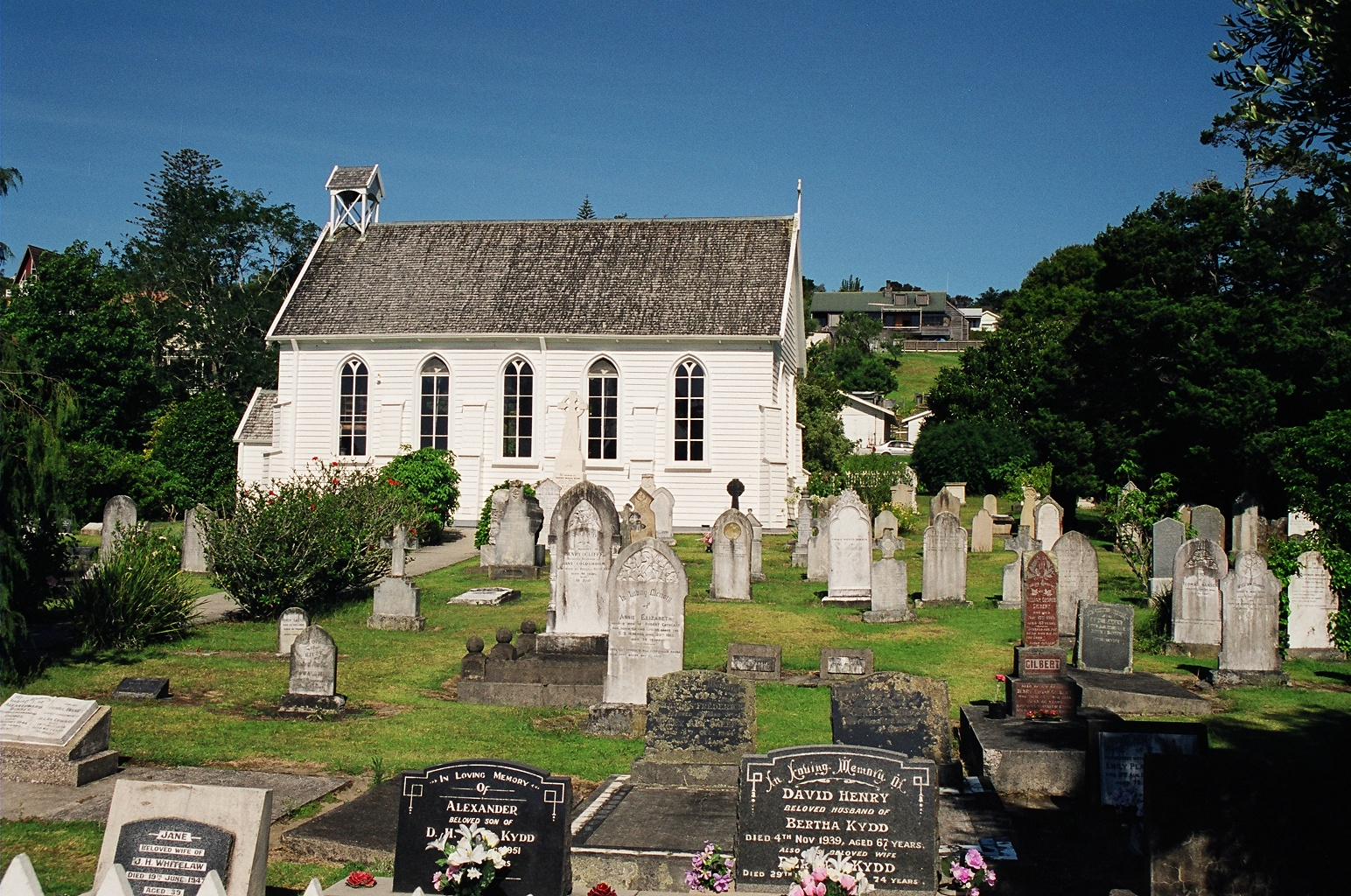
Christ Church, built in 1835 is New Zealand's oldest church.

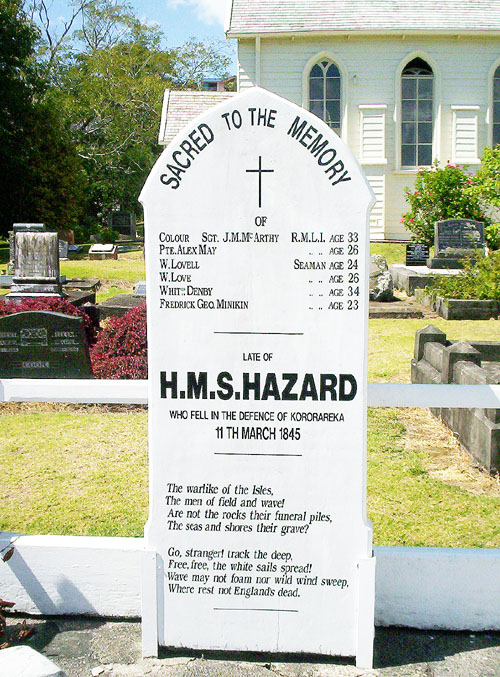
Memorial for Royal Navy personnel killed during fighting in 1845.

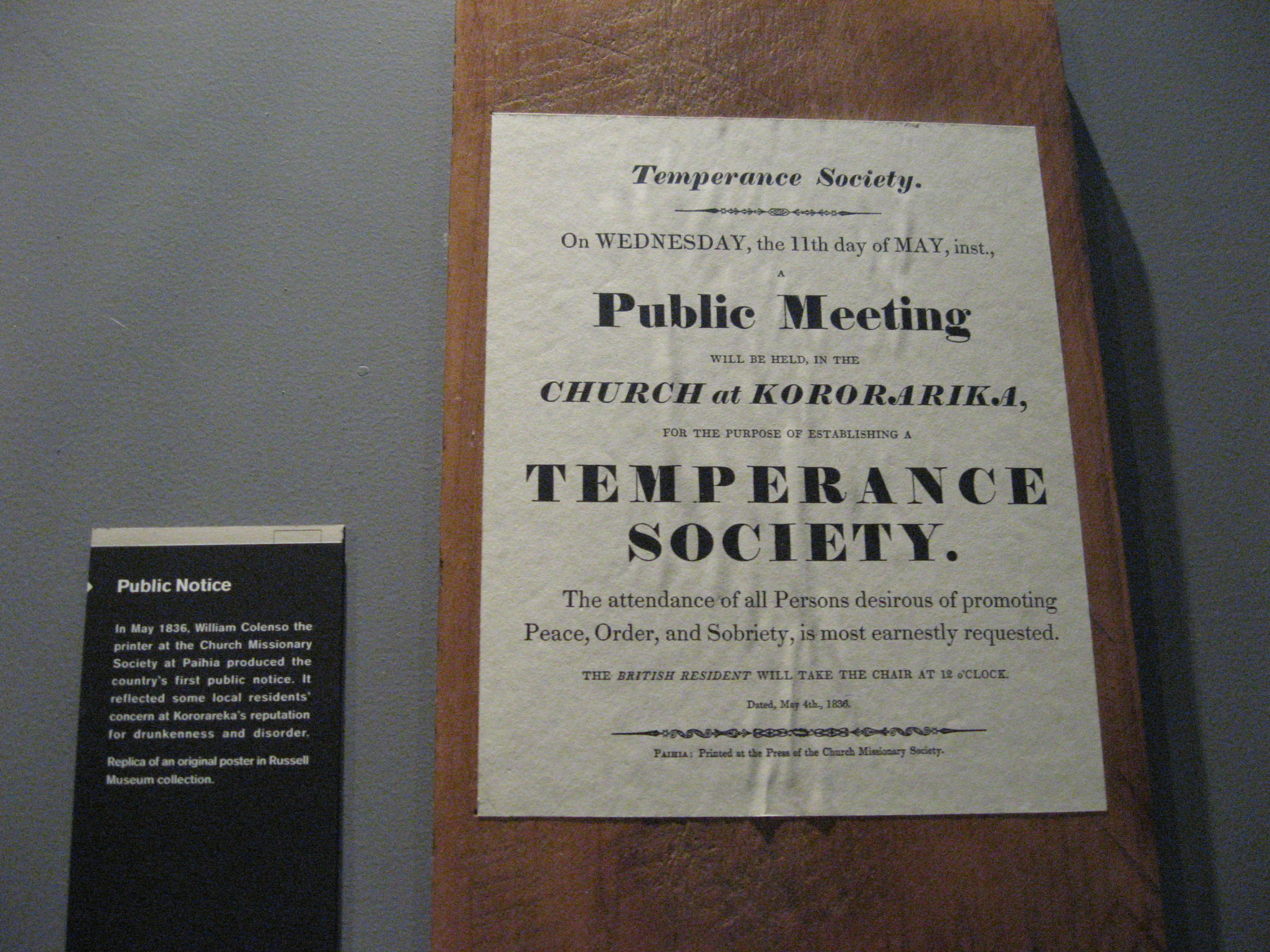
The first public notice in New Zealand was printed for Kororarika by William Colenso's press in Paihia, across the Bay of Islands.

=== Māori settlement ===
The area now known as Russell was first inhabited by Māori because of its pleasant climate and the abundance of food, fish and fertile soil. The settlement was known as Kororāreka, and was located on the coast. The name translates to 'delicious blue penguin', after an ailing chief who had eaten a penguin broth remarked ka reka te kororā or 'the kororā is delicious'.

Early European explorers James Cook and Marc-Joseph Marion du Fresne remarked, by their arrival in the 18th century, that the area was quite prosperous.

=== Early European settlement ===
When European and American ships began visiting New Zealand in the early 1800s, the indigenous Māori quickly recognised there were great advantages in trading with these strangers, whom they called tauiwi. The Bay of Islands offered a safe anchorage and had a large Māori population. To attract ships, Māori began to supply food, timber and prostitution. In exchange, the Māori population traded for firearms, alcohol and other goods of European manufacture.

Kororāreka developed as a result of this trade but soon earned a reputation as a community full of prostitution and without laws. It became known as the "Hell Hole of the Pacific"; European law had no influence and Māori law was seldom enforced within the town's area. Fighting on the beach at Kororāreka in March 1830, between northern and southern subtribes (hapū) within the Ngāpuhi iwi, became known as the Girls' War.

On 30 January 1840 at Christ Church, Governor William Hobson read his proclamations (which were the beginnings of the Treaty of Waitangi) in the presence of a number of settlers and the Māori chief Moka Te Kainga-mataa. A document confirming what had happened was signed at this time by around forty witnesses, including Moka, the only Māori signatory. The following week, the treaty proceedings moved across to the western side of the bay to Waitangi.

By this time, Kororāreka was an important mercantile centre and served as a vital resupply port for whaling and sealing operations. When the Colony of New Zealand was founded in that year, Hobson was reluctant to choose Kororāreka as his capital, due to its bad reputation. Instead, he purchased land at Okiato, situated five kilometres to the south, and renamed it Russell in honour of the Secretary of State for the Colonies, Lord John Russell. Hobson soon decided that the move to the Okiato site was a mistake, and Auckland was selected as the new capital not long after.

Kororāreka was part of the Port of Russell, and after Russell (now Okiato) became virtually deserted, Kororāreka gradually came to be known as Russell as well. In January 1844, Governor Robert FitzRoy officially designated Kororāreka as part of the township of Russell. Today, the name Russell applies only to Kororāreka, while the former capital is known either by its original name of Okiato or as Old Russell.

=== Catholic mission ===
In 1841–42, Jean Baptiste Pompallier established a Roman Catholic mission in Russell, which contained a printing press for the production of Māori-language religious texts. His building, known as Pompallier Mission, remains in the care of Heritage New Zealand.

On 18 November 1844, while at anchor in the Bay of Islands, Mary Davis Wallis described "Kororarika" as a town "which appears small, consisting of a few houses along the shore, and cottages scattered here and there on the slope of the hills behind. Nothing is to be seen back of the town but lofty hills not particularly verdant."

=== Flagstaff War ===
The Flagstaff War was touched off in 1845 by the repeated felling and re-erection of the Union Jack on Flagstaff Hill above the town. The town was sacked by Hōne Heke, after diversionary raids drew away the British defenders. The flagstaff was felled for the fourth time at the commencement of the Battle of Kororāreka, and the inhabitants fled aboard British ships, which then shelled and destroyed most of the houses.

Hōne Heke directed his warriors not to interfere with Christ Church and the Pompallier Mission.

=== Twenty-first century ===
In January 2023, the New Zealand Geographic Board endorsed a proposal that the name of the town be officially changed to Kororāreka. However, in May 2025 Minister for Land Information Chris Penk declined the proposal.

== Demographics ==
Russell covers 3.28 km^{2} (1.27 sq mi) and had an estimated population of 820 as of June 2025, with a population density of 250 people per km^{2}.

Historical population
Year	Pop.	±% p.a.
2006	786	—
2013	702	−1.60%
2018	762	+1.65%
2023	798	+0.93%

Russell had a population of 798 in the 2023 New Zealand census, an increase of 36 people (4.7%) since the 2018 census, and an increase of 96 people (13.7%) since the 2013 census. There were 384 males, 408 females and 3 people of other genders in 408 dwellings. 3.0% of people identified as LGBTIQ+. The median age was 61.0 years (compared with 38.1 years nationally). There were 57 people (7.1%) aged under 15 years, 66 (8.3%) aged 15 to 29, 342 (42.9%) aged 30 to 64, and 330 (41.4%) aged 65 or older.

People could identify as more than one ethnicity. The results were 84.6% European (Pākehā); 21.8% Māori; 1.5% Pasifika; 1.9% Asian; 1.1% Middle Eastern, Latin American and African New Zealanders (MELAA); and 2.3% other, which includes people giving their ethnicity as "New Zealander". English was spoken by 98.5%, Māori language by 4.9%, and other languages by 12.8%. No language could be spoken by 0.8% (e.g. too young to talk). The percentage of people born overseas was 33.1, compared with 28.8% nationally.

Religious affiliations were 24.4% Christian, 0.4% Hindu, 1.5% Māori religious beliefs, 1.1% Buddhist, 0.8% New Age, 0.4% Jewish, and 0.8% other religions. People who answered that they had no religion were 62.4%, and 8.6% of people did not answer the census question.

Of those at least 15 years old, 150 (20.2%) people had a bachelor's or higher degree, 366 (49.4%) had a post-high school certificate or diploma, and 177 (23.9%) people exclusively held high school qualifications. The median income was $32,500, compared with $41,500 nationally. 63 people (8.5%) earned over $100,000 compared to 12.1% nationally. The employment status of those at least 15 was that 258 (34.8%) people were employed full-time, 123 (16.6%) were part-time, and 15 (2.0%) were unemployed.

Much of the accommodation in the area consists of holiday homes or tourist accommodation.

=== Marae ===
The local Kororāreka Marae is a traditional meeting ground of Te Kapotai, a hapū of Ngāpuhi.

== Climate ==
Russell has a humid subtropical climate.

Climate data for Russell, elevation 15 m (49 ft), (2016–2024)
Month	Jan	Feb	Mar	Apr	May	Jun	Jul	Aug	Sep	Oct	Nov	Dec	Year
Mean daily maximum °C (°F)	25.1 (77.2)	25.0 (77.0)	23.8 (74.8)	21.7 (71.1)	19.6 (67.3)	17.3 (63.1)	16.7 (62.1)	17.0 (62.6)	18.3 (64.9)	19.9 (67.8)	21.6 (70.9)	23.7 (74.7)	20.8 (69.5)
Daily mean °C (°F)	19.9 (67.8)	20.2 (68.4)	18.7 (65.7)	17.0 (62.6)	15.1 (59.2)	12.8 (55.0)	12.1 (53.8)	12.2 (54.0)	13.5 (56.3)	15.0 (59.0)	16.7 (62.1)	18.6 (65.5)	16.0 (60.8)
Mean daily minimum °C (°F)	14.7 (58.5)	15.4 (59.7)	13.7 (56.7)	12.3 (54.1)	10.6 (51.1)	8.4 (47.1)	7.4 (45.3)	7.4 (45.3)	8.6 (47.5)	10.1 (50.2)	11.8 (53.2)	13.6 (56.5)	11.2 (52.1)
Average rainfall mm (inches)	93.2 (3.67)	90.1 (3.55)	108.8 (4.28)	118.7 (4.67)	139.2 (5.48)	148.6 (5.85)	177.0 (6.97)	143.7 (5.66)	112.2 (4.42)	81.5 (3.21)	74.7 (2.94)	104.1 (4.10)	1,391.8 (54.8)
Source: NIWA (rainfall 1991–2020)

== Economy ==
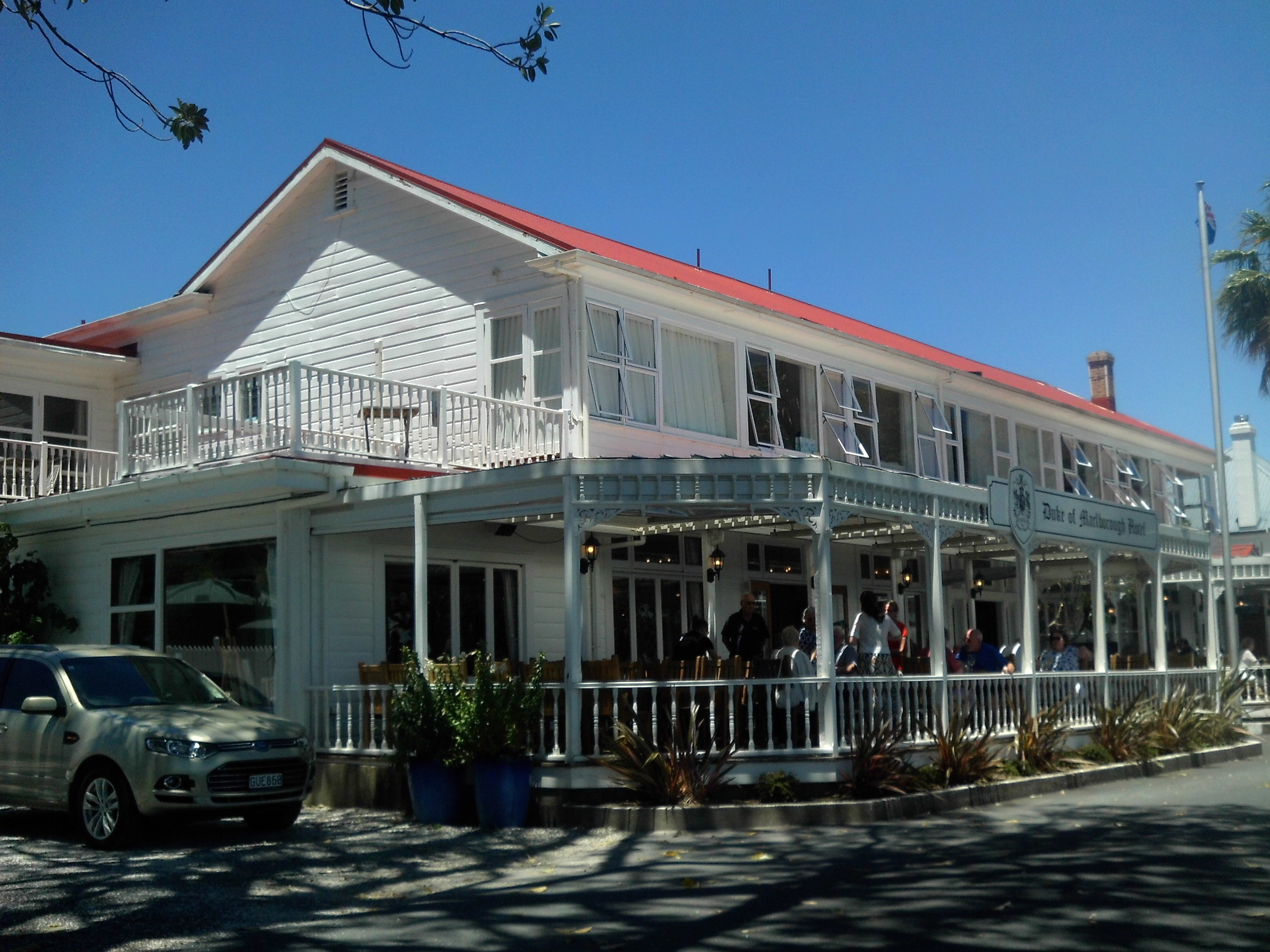
Duke of Marlborough Hotel

Russell is now mostly a "bastion of cafés, gift shops and B&Bs".

Pompallier Mission, the historic printery/tannery/storehouse of the early Roman Catholic missionaries, is the oldest surviving industrial building in New Zealand, while the town's Christ Church is the country's oldest surviving Anglican church. The surrounding area also contains many expensive holiday homes, as well as New Zealand's most expensive rental accommodation, the Eagles Nest.

A car ferry across the Bay of Islands runs between Okiato and Opua, and is the main tourist access to Russell. There is a land connection, but this requires a substantial detour (the ferry route is only 2.3 kilometres, while the land route is 43.5 km).

== Education ==
Russell School is a coeducational full primary (years 1–8) school with a roll of 64 as of July 2026. The school opened in 1892.

== Notable people ==
- Laurence Aberhart (1949–present), photographer
- Lucy Takiora Lord (1842–1893), guide and interpreter
