= Christ Church, Russell =

Christ Church
- Māori: Te Whare Karakia o Kororareka
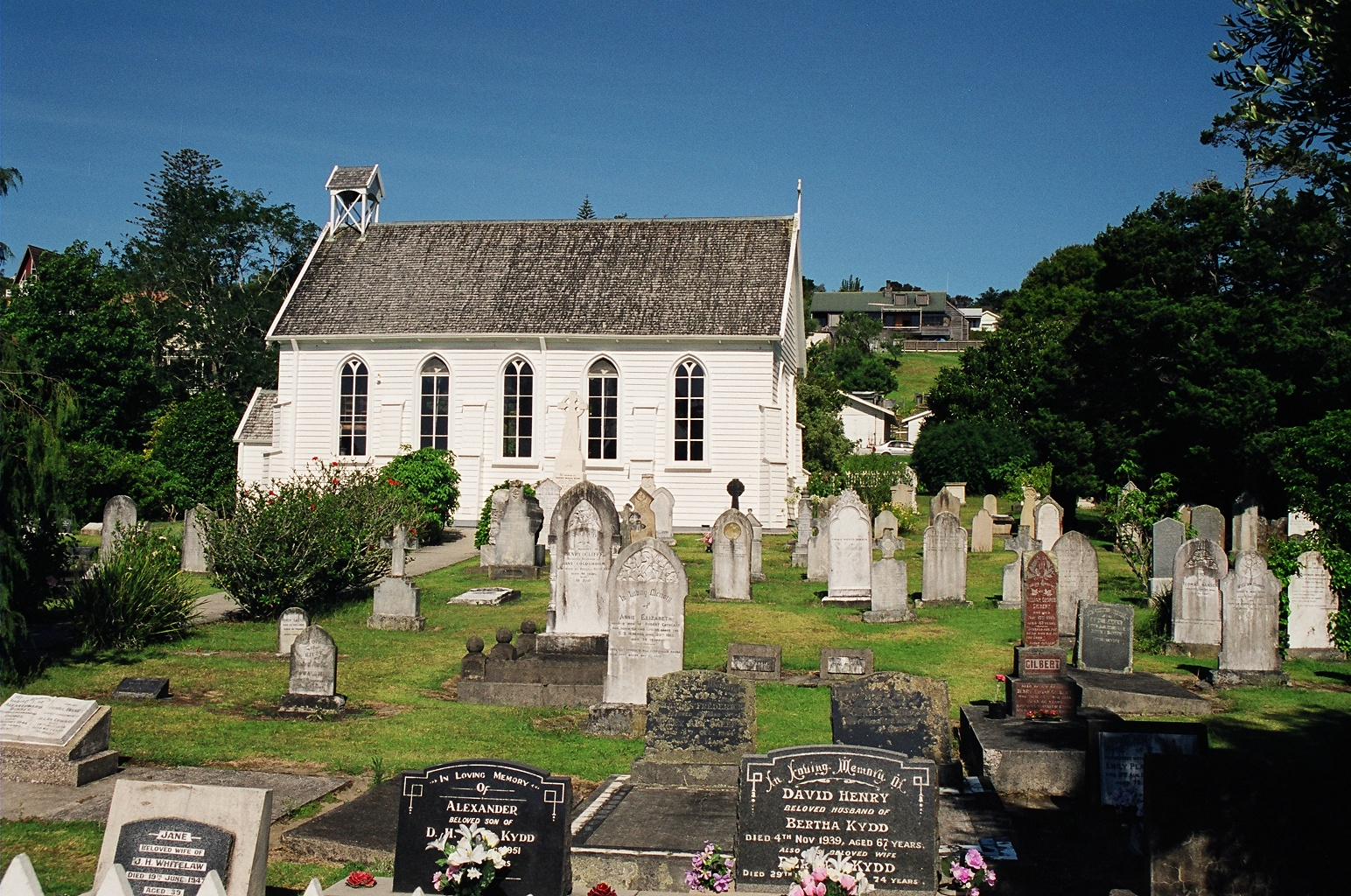
- Christ Church in Russell, with its historic graveyard, in 2001
- Christ Church
- 35°15′47.6″S 174°07′24.8″E
- Address: Church Street, Russell, Bay of Islands
- Country: New Zealand
- Denomination: Anglican

History
- Status: Church
- Dedicated: c. 1870s

Architecture
- Functional status: Active
- Architectural type: Church
- Completed: 1835

Heritage New Zealand – Category 1
- Designated: 24 November 1983
- Reference no.: 1

Christ Church (Māori: Te Whare Karakia o Kororareka) is New Zealand's oldest surviving church, located in the village of Russell.

The Anglican church was built in 1835 by Gilbert Mair under the supervision of Charles Baker (later Reverend), and originally held services in both English and Māori. It was also occasionally used as the local courthouse.

The church was registered by Heritage New Zealand on 24 November 1983 as registration number 1, with a category I listing.

== 19th century ==
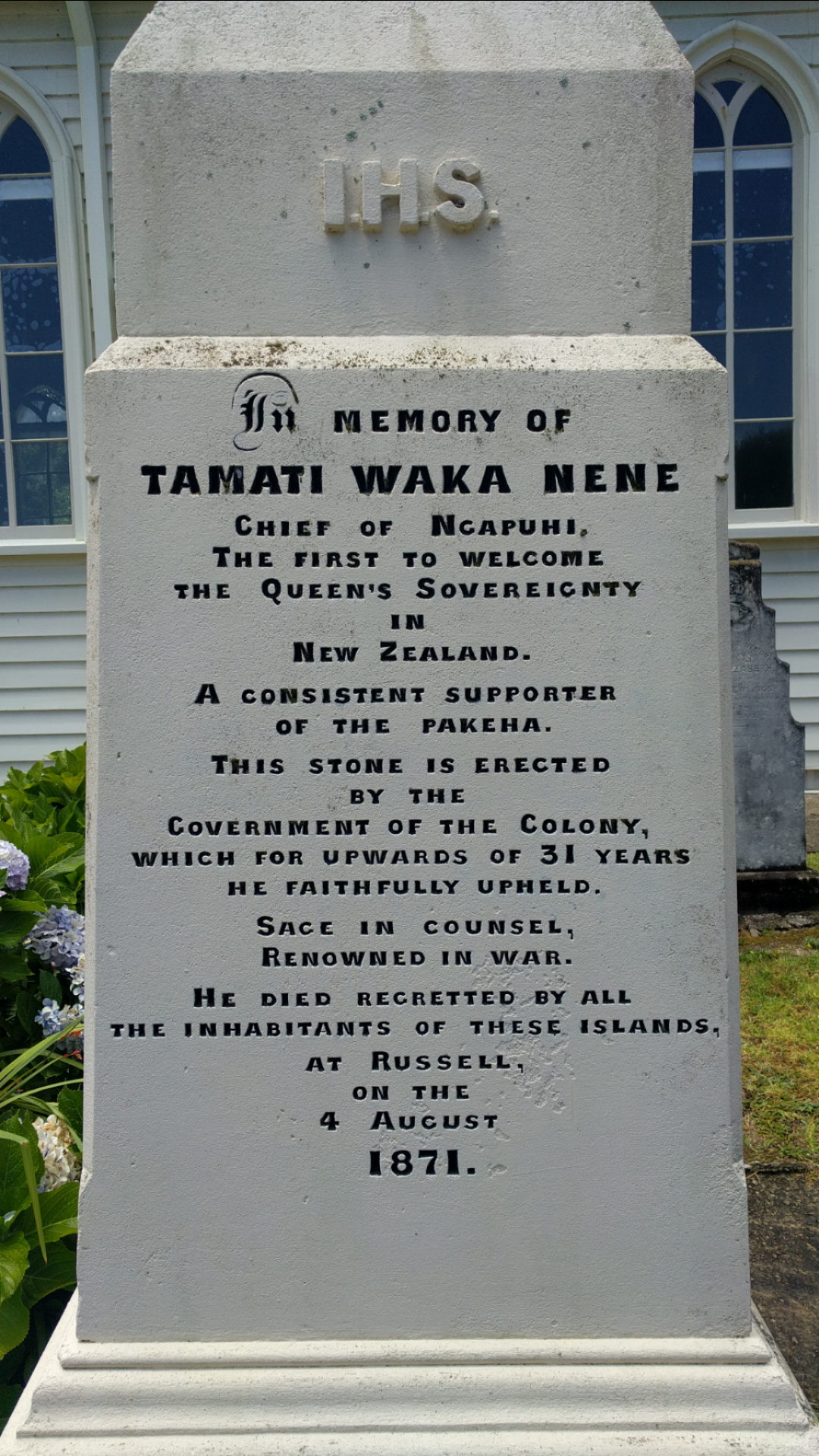
Tāmati Wāka Nene memorial in the Christ Church cemetery

In the early 19th century, Russell, then known as Kororareka, was used as a safe harbour by whalers. The land for the church was purchased in 1834 from local chiefs on the condition that Māori and Pākehā (non-Māori) would have the same right to burial.

The cost of its construction was contributed to by Charles Darwin. Although Darwin, on his 1835 visit, described the town as a "stronghold of vice", he was impressed by the then near-completed church, which he saw as "a bold experiment". Darwin, Captain Fitzroy, and other officers of HMS Beagle are recorded as contributing to the church's construction.

The church was built in 1835 with a simple design and hipped roof. Initially, services were performed by missionaries who had to row across the harbour from Paihia. The first service was performed on 3 January 1836 by William Williams. During this time, services were conducted in English and Māori. The church also was occasionally used as the local courthouse.

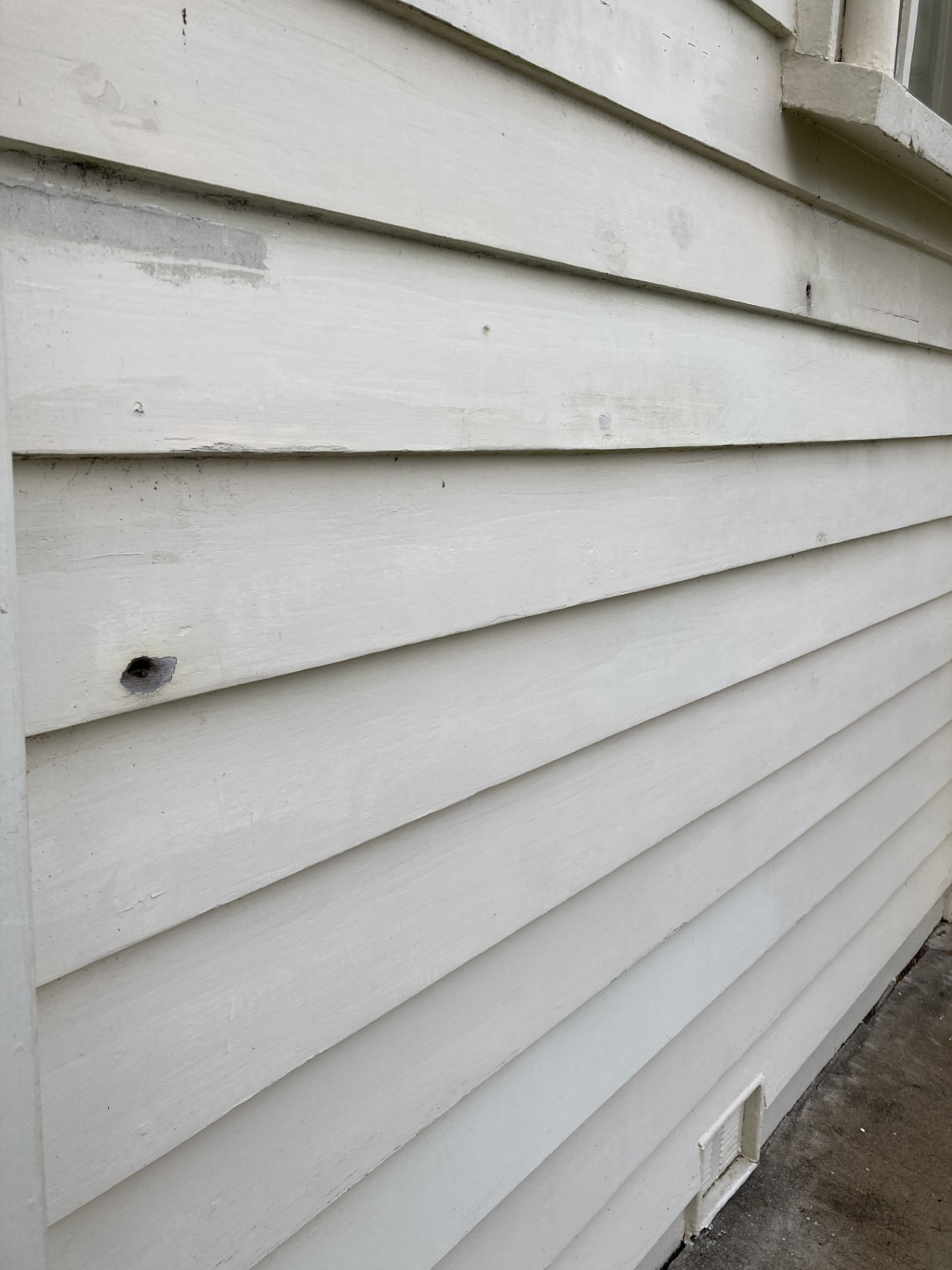
Holes made by musket balls during the Battle of Kororāreka

Captain William Hobson, in a meeting on 30 January 1840 with both Māori and Pākehā, used the church to proclaim that New Zealand would be ruled through New South Wales and that he would serve as Lieutenant Governor of New Zealand. Further proceedings relating to the Treaty of Waitangi occurred across the harbour at Waitangi one week later.

The church was damaged in the Battle of Kororareka in 1845 by musket and cannonballs. Tāmati Wāka Nene, a Māori chief who fought for the British in that conflict, is buried in the church graveyard.

In the early 1870s, the church was given its current name and extended with a belfry.

== 20th century ==
In the early 20th century, Christ Church was served by vicars based at Kawakawa and from 1953 onwards, Kerikeri. In 1963 Queen Elizabeth II and Prince Philip visited the church, and in 1986 for its 150th anniversary Prime Minister David Lange and Sir Paul Reeves attended.

The church was registered by the New Zealand Historic Places Trust (now called Heritage New Zealand) on 24 November 1983 as registration number 1, with a category I listing.

== 21st century ==
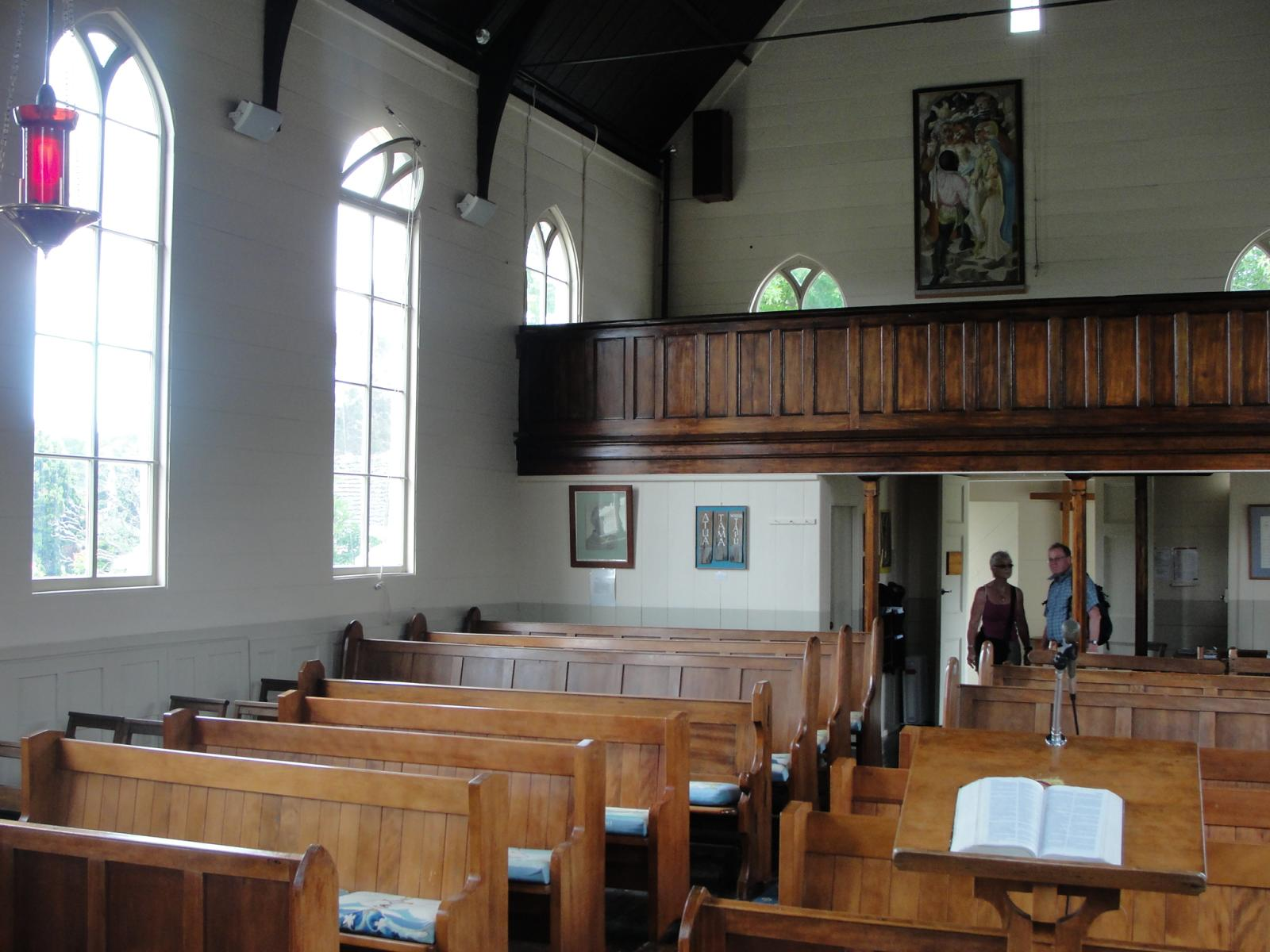
Interior of Christ Church

In 2000 the church was restored and is now also a tourist attraction. The church continues to be in weekly use for Anglican worship, with services each Sunday at 10.30am, and some services in Te Reo Maori, and is a venue for weddings, funerals and other special services. It has been speculated that the church is the oldest building in New Zealand that is still being used for its original intended purpose.

In 2018 the first Anglican ordination of a New Zealander in an openly gay relationship occurred at Christ Church.

== Sources ==
- King, Marie M. (1949). Port in the North. Russell Centennial Historical Committee. p. 204. OCLC 154651594.
