= Hutt South =

- Single-member general constituency for the New Zealand House of Representatives
- Interactive map of boundaries from the 2026 election
- Formation: 1996
- Region: Wellington
- Character: Suburban
- Term: 3 years

Member for Hutt South
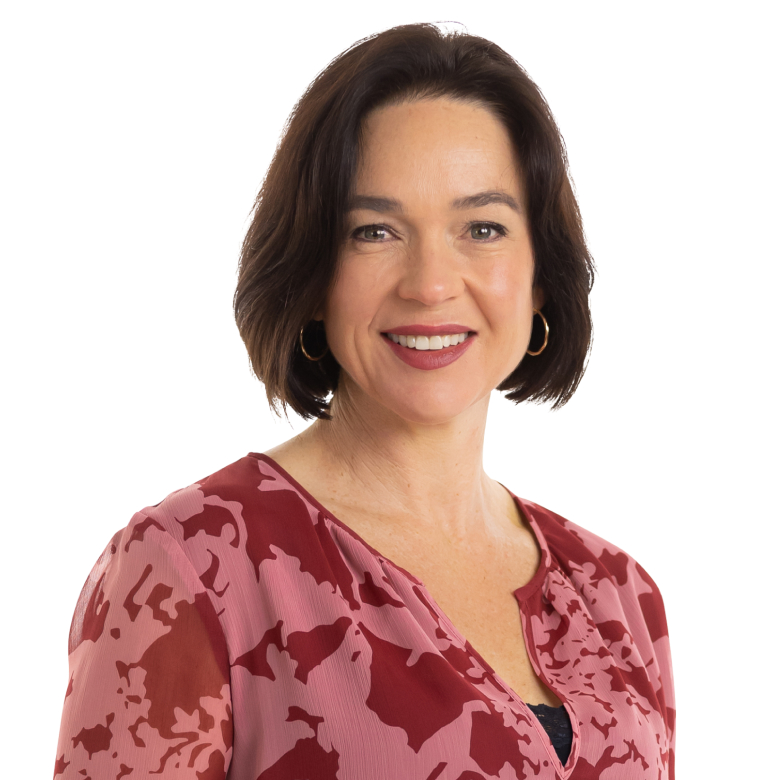
- Ginny Andersen since 7 November 2026
- Party: Labour
- Previous MP: Ginny Andersen (Labour)
Party vote distribution

Hutt South is a parliamentary electorate in the lower Hutt Valley and the Wellington suburb of Newlands of New Zealand. It is held by Chris Bishop of the National Party following the 2023 election. It was previously held by Ginny Andersen of the Labour Party from 2020 to 2023.

== Population centres ==
The electorate is based on the southern part of the city of Lower Hutt. It was formed in 1996 from the Pencarrow and Eastern Hutt electorates, which were abolished. Hutt South consists of the southern suburbs of Lower Hutt, Petone, Wainuiomata, and Eastbourne.

=== 2014 boundary review ===
Map of boundaries at the 2020 and 2023 general elections)

Following the 2014 boundary review, Hutt South lost Naenae and a small part of Epuni to Rimutaka, in exchange for the suburbs of Kelson and Belmont. It also gained the suburbs of Tirohanga, Harbour View, Normandale, Maungaraki and Korokoro from Ōhariu, meaning the entire Hutt Valley was now covered by just two electorates (Rimutaka and Hutt South).

Since 2014, the following suburbs of Lower Hutt fall within Hutt South.

- Alicetown
- Belmont
- Boulcott
- Days Bay
- Eastbourne
- Epuni (south of and including Roberts Street)
- Fairfield
- Gracefield
- Harbour View
- Hutt Central
- Kelson
- Korokoro
- Lowry Bay
- Mahina Bay
- Maungaraki
- Melling
- Moera
- Normandale
- Petone
- Point Howard
- Seaview
- Sorrento Bay
- Sunshine Bay
- Tirohanga
- Wainuiomata
- Waiwhetū
- Waterloo
- Woburn
- York Bay

=== 2025 boundary review ===
In the 2025 boundary review, Hutt South and Remutaka both shifted south-westwards, with the former taking in Newlands, a suburb of Wellington City. This is effective from the 2026 election.

== History ==
At the first MMP election in 1996, Hutt South replaced the earlier electorate of Pencarrow, which was then held by Trevor Mallard. Mallard was returned at every general election until he moved to list-only at the 2017 election.

=== Members of Parliament ===
Key

Labour National NZ First United Future Green

Election	Winner
1996 election	Trevor Mallard
1999 election	Trevor Mallard
2002 election	Trevor Mallard
2005 election	Trevor Mallard
2008 election	Trevor Mallard
2011 election	Trevor Mallard
2014 election	Trevor Mallard
2017 election	Chris Bishop
2020 election	Ginny Andersen
2023 election	Chris Bishop
2026 election	Ginny Andersen

=== List MPs ===
Members of Parliament elected from party lists in elections where that person also unsuccessfully contested the Hutt South electorate. Unless otherwise stated, all MPs terms began and ended at general elections.

Election	Winner
1996 election	Joy McLauchlan
1996 election	Deborah Morris (Note: Morris resigned from Parliament on 20 December 1998.)
2002 election	Murray Smith
2008 election	Paul Quinn
2011 election	Holly Walker
2014 election	Chris Bishop
2017 election	Ginny Andersen
2020 election	Chris Bishop
2023 election	Ginny Andersen

== Election results ==
=== 2026 election ===
The next election will be held on 7 November 2026. Candidates for Hutt South are listed at Candidates in the 2026 New Zealand general election by electorate § Hutt South. Official results will be available after 27 November 2026.

=== 2023 election ===
2023 general election results: Hutt South
Notes:	Blue background denotes the winner of the electorate vote. Pink background denotes a candidate elected from their party list. Yellow background denotes an electorate win by a list member, or other incumbent. A ✓ or ✗ denotes status of any incumbent, win or lose respectively.						
Party	Candidate	Votes	%	±%	Party votes	%	±%
National	Chris Bishop	19,144	44.37	+2.78	14,772	33.90	+11.91
Labour	✗ Ginny Andersen	17,812	41.28	–8.72	14,087	32.33	–22.81
Green	Neelu Jennings	2,492	5.78	+3.17	6,727	15.44	+6.01
NZ First	Lee Donoghue	1,228	2.85	+2.15	2,257	5.18	+2.83
Opportunities	Ben Wylie-Van Eerd	980	2.27	+0.96	1,448	3.32	+1.16
ACT	Andy Parkins	556	1.29	+0.56	2,493	5.72	+0.09
NZ Loyal	Jordan Blane	403	0.93		324	0.74	
Vision New Zealand	Max Rangitutia	171	0.40				
Te Pāti Māori					581	1.33	+0.89
NewZeal					215	0.49	
Legalise Cannabis					147	0.34	+0.29
Freedoms NZ					99	0.23	
Animal Justice					77	0.18	
DemocracyNZ					53	0.12	
New Conservative					50	0.12	–1.04
Women's Rights					32	0.07	
Leighton Baker Party					21	0.05	
New Nation					2	0.01	
Informal votes		361			191		
Total valid votes		43,147			43,576		
Turnout							
National gain from Labour	Majority	1,332	3.09				

=== 2020 election ===
2020 general election: Hutt South
Notes:	Blue background denotes the winner of the electorate vote. Pink background denotes a candidate elected from their party list. Yellow background denotes an electorate win by a list member, or other incumbent. A ✓ or ✗ denotes status of any incumbent, win or lose respectively.						
Party	Candidate	Votes	%	±%	Party votes	%	±%
Labour	Ginny Andersen	22,453	50.00	+6.21	25,159	55.14	+14.93
National	✗ Chris Bishop	18,676	41.59	−5.90	10,033	21.99	−19.48
Green	Richard McIntosh	1,171	2.61	−0.61	4,301	9.43	+2.18
Opportunities	Ben Wylie-Van Eerd	590	1.31	−0.60	986	2.16	−1.28
New Conservative	Roger Earp	562	1.25	—	528	1.16	+0.99
ACT	Andy Parkins	330	0.73	+0.51	2,568	5.63	+5.18
NZ First	Mahesh Bindra	316	0.70	−1.44	1,071	2.35	−3.16
Advance NZ	Mishaela Daken	302	0.67	—	309	0.68	—
ONE	Edward Shanly	192	0.43	—	201	0.44	—
Vision NZ	Paris Winiata	201	0.45	—	51	0.11	—
Outdoors	Wilf Bearman-Riedel	115	0.26	−0.01	38	0.08	−0.04
Māori Party					201	0.44	+0.03
Legalise Cannabis					112	0.25	+0.05
Sustainable NZ					30	0.07	—
TEA					25	0.05	—
Social Credit					9	0.02	+0.01
Heartland					3	0.01	—
Informal votes		560			255		
Total valid votes		44,908			45,625		
Turnout							
Labour gain from National	Majority	3,777	8.41	+12.11			

=== 2017 election ===
2017 general election: Hutt South
Notes:	Blue background denotes the winner of the electorate vote. Pink background denotes a candidate elected from their party list. Yellow background denotes an electorate win by a list member, or other incumbent. A ✓ or ✗ denotes status of any incumbent, win or lose respectively.						
Party	Candidate	Votes	%	±%	Party votes	%	±%
National	Chris Bishop	19,643	47.49	+5.84	17,390	41.47	−3.60
Labour	Ginny Andersen	18,113	43.79	+0.31	16,858	40.21	+12.37
Green	Virginia Horrocks	1,331	3.22	−5.06	3,041	7.25	−5.43
NZ First	Alok Gupta	887	2.14	−0.45	2,311	5.51	−1.93
Opportunities	Richard Warwick	792	1.91	—	1,442	3.44	—
Outdoors	Wilf Bearman-Riedel	112	0.27	—	52	0.12	—
ACT	Andy Parkins	89	0.22	−0.32	189	0.45	0.31
Independent	Dorothy Frances Fox	58	0.14	—			
Māori Party					173	0.41	−0.19
Legalise Cannabis					85	0.20	−0.28
Conservative					71	0.17	−3.38
United Future					31	0.07	−0.27
Ban 1080					24	0.06	−0.03
Internet					11	0.03	—
People's Party					10	0.02	—
Mana Party					6	0.01	—
Democrats					3	0.01	−0.03
Informal votes		340			232		
Total valid votes		41,365			41,929		
Turnout		42,309	84.26	+2.57			
National gain from Labour	Majority	1,530	3.70	+1.87			

=== 2014 election ===
2014 general election: Hutt South
Notes:	Blue background denotes the winner of the electorate vote. Pink background denotes a candidate elected from their party list. Yellow background denotes an electorate win by a list member, or other incumbent. A ✓ or ✗ denotes status of any incumbent, win or lose respectively.						
Party	Candidate	Votes	%	±%	Party votes	%	±%
Labour	✓ Trevor Mallard	16,836	43.48	−5.9	10,903	27.84	−7.86
National	Chris Bishop	16,127	41.65	+7.32	17,648	45.07	+4.02
Green	Holly Walker	3,207	8.28	−3.24	4,966	12.68	+0.71
NZ First	Mataroa Paroro	1,005	2.59	+2.59	2,913	7.44	+1.44
Conservative	Gordon Copeland	858	2.21	−0.96	1,391	3.55	+1.52
ACT	Grae O'Sullivan	172	0.54	−1.40	249	0.76	−2.00
Independent	Jan Pajak	117	0.30				
United Future	Dave Stonyer	107	0.27	−0.80	136	0.34	−0.54
Māori Party					207	0.60	−0.25
Legalise Cannabis					160	0.48	+0.11
Internet Mana					281	0.37	+0.37
Democrats					11	0.04	+0.02
Democrats					11	0.04	+0.02
Civilian					19	0.04	
Ban 1080					58	0.03	
Independent Coalition					7	0.02	
Informal votes		276			199		
Total valid votes		38,713			39,161		
Labour hold	Majority	709	1.83	−13.22			

=== 2011 election ===
2011 general election: Hutt South
Notes:	Blue background denotes the winner of the electorate vote. Pink background denotes a candidate elected from their party list. Yellow background denotes an electorate win by a list member, or other incumbent. A ✓ or ✗ denotes status of any incumbent, win or lose respectively.						
Party	Candidate	Votes	%	±%	Party votes	%	±%
Labour	✓ Trevor Mallard	15,828	49.38	+0.10	11,751	35.70	−7.09
National	Paul Quinn	11,003	34.33	−2.89	13,510	41.05	+3.21
Green	Holly Walker	3,693	11.52	+3.74	3,940	11.97	+4.28
Conservative	Gordon Copeland	1,015	3.17	+3.17	667	2.03	+2.03
United Future	Rob Eaddy	342	1.07	−1.33	294	0.89	−0.53
ACT	Alex Speirs	172	0.54	−1.40	249	0.76	−2.00
NZ First					1,974	6.00	+2.50
Māori Party					196	0.60	−0.25
Legalise Cannabis					157	0.48	+0.11
Mana					123	0.37	+0.37
Libertarianz					23	0.07	−0.03
Alliance					18	0.05	−0.08
Democrats					12	0.04	+0.02
Informal votes		728			266		
Total valid votes		32,053			32,914		
Labour hold	Majority	4,825	15.05	+2.99			

Electorate (as at 26 November 2011): 43,215

=== 2008 election ===
2008 general election: Hutt South
Notes:	Blue background denotes the winner of the electorate vote. Pink background denotes a candidate elected from their party list. Yellow background denotes an electorate win by a list member, or other incumbent. A ✓ or ✗ denotes status of any incumbent, win or lose respectively.						
Party	Candidate	Votes	%	±%	Party votes	%	±%
Labour	✓ Trevor Mallard	16,690	49.28		14,769	42.79	
National	Paul Quinn	12,604	37.21		13,057	37.83	
Green	Virginia Horrocks	2,635	7.78		2,655	7.69	
United Future	Murray Smith	812	2.40		490	1.42	
ACT	Lindsay Mitchell	655	1.93		950	2.75	
Kiwi	Camilia Chin	380	1.12		203	0.59	
Libertarianz	Phil Howison	93	0.27		36	0.10	
NZ First					1,208	3.50	-
Progressive					305	0.88	
Māori Party					293	0.85	
Bill and Ben					197	0.57	
Legalise Cannabis					128	0.37	
Family Party					83	0.24	
Pacific					63	0.18	
Alliance					45	0.13	
Workers Party					12	0.03	
RAM					8	0.02	
Democrats					7	0.02	
RONZ					3	0.01	
Informal votes		414			157		
Total valid votes		33,869			34,512		
Labour hold	Majority	4,086					

Note: lines coloured beige denote the winner of the electorate vote. Lines coloured pink denote a candidate elected to Parliament from their party list.

=== 2005 election ===
2005 general election: Hutt South
Notes:	Blue background denotes the winner of the electorate vote. Pink background denotes a candidate elected from their party list. Yellow background denotes an electorate win by a list member, or other incumbent. A ✓ or ✗ denotes status of any incumbent, win or lose respectively.						
Party	Candidate	Votes	%	±%	Party votes	%	±%
Labour	✓ Trevor Mallard	16,125	50.02		15,534	47.54	
National	Rosemarie Thomas	10,385	32.21		11,464	35.09	
United Future	Murray Smith	1,905	5.91		974	2.85	
Green	Paul Bruce	1,719	5.33		1,831	5.60	
NZ First	Howard Levarko	698	2.17		1,262	3.86	
ACT	Lindsay Mitchell	579	1.80		420	1.29	
Destiny	David Knight	335	1.04		181	0.55	
Māori Party	Maraea Ropata	322	1.00		193	0.59	
Independent	Jack McSeveny	106	0.33				
Libertarianz	Phil Howison	64	0.20		21	0.06	
Progressive					337	1.03	
Legalise Cannabis					77	0.24	
Alliance					27	0.08	
Christian Heritage					21	0.06	
Family Rights					11	0.03	
Democrats					9	0.03	
99 MP					7	0.02	
Direct Democracy					4	0.01	
One NZ					4	0.01	
RONZ					3	0.01	
Informal votes		307			144		
Total valid votes		32,238			32,673		
Labour hold	Majority	5,740					

=== 2002 election ===
2002 general election: Hutt South
Notes:	Blue background denotes the winner of the electorate vote. Pink background denotes a candidate elected from their party list. Yellow background denotes an electorate win by a list member, or other incumbent. A ✓ or ✗ denotes status of any incumbent, win or lose respectively.						
Party	Candidate	Votes	%	±%	Party votes	%	±%
Labour	✓ Trevor Mallard	14,834	49.09	−5.77	13,985	45.40	+3.22
National	Richard Townley	7,063	23.37		5,718	18.56	−11.67
United Future	Murray Smith	2,910	9.63		2,700	8.76	
ACT	Christopher Milne	2,033	6.73	+3.06	2,474	8.03	+1.52
Green	Perce Harpham	1,726	5.71		1,980	6.43	+1.85
Alliance	Anna Sutherland	581	1.92		462	1.50	−6.17
Progressive	Ross Weddell	566	1.87		562	1.82	
Christian Heritage	Dennis John Bartlett	508	1.68		362	1.18	−0.80
NZ First					2,139	6.94	+4.48
ORNZ					223	0.72	
Legalise Cannabis					167	0.54	−0.60
One NZ					22	0.07	+0.04
Mana Māori					12	0.04	+0.02
NMP					1	0.00	−0.02
Informal votes		508			117		
Total valid votes		30,221			30,807		
Labour hold	Majority	7,771	25.72	−2.29			

=== 1999 election ===
1999 general election: Hutt South
Notes:	Blue background denotes the winner of the electorate vote. Pink background denotes a candidate elected from their party list. Yellow background denotes an electorate win by a list member, or other incumbent. A ✓ or ✗ denotes status of any incumbent, win or lose respectively.						
Party	Candidate	Votes	%	±%	Party votes	%	±%
Labour	✓ Trevor Mallard	17,404	54.86	+9.87	13,502	42.18	+8.30
National	Clare Radosmke	8,519	26.85		9,678	30.23	−3.42
ACT	Christopher Milne	1,165	3.67	+1.48	2,085	6.51	+1.38
Alliance	Gordon Parr	1,124	3.54		2,454	7.67	−2.89
Green	Cliff Mason	1,068	3.37		1,465	4.58	
Christian Heritage	Rosemarie Thomas	785	2.47		633	1.98	
Christian Democrats	David Ogden	498	1.57		564	1.76	
NZ First	Edwin Perry	482	1.52		786	2.46	−5.88
McGillicuddy Serious	Jonat Warton	211	0.67		49	0.15	−0.17
Independent	Lois McInnes	180	0.57				
United NZ	Frank Owen	178	0.56	−0.15	201	0.63	−0.88
Natural Law	Jon Muller	61	0.19		24	0.07	+0.03
Mauri Pacific	Richard Waitai	49	0.15		19	0.06	
Legalise Cannabis					365	1.14	−0.08
Libertarianz					88	0.27	+0.24
Animals First					57	0.18	−0.01
One NZ					10	0.03	
The People's Choice					8	0.02	
Mana Māori					7	0.02	−0.01
NMP					7	0.02	
Republican					5	0.02	
South Island					4	0.01	
Freedom Movement					0	0.00	
Informal votes		579			292		
Total valid votes		31,724			32,011		
Labour hold	Majority	8,885	28.01	+20.13			

=== 1996 election ===
1996 general election: Hutt South
Notes:	Blue background denotes the winner of the electorate vote. Pink background denotes a candidate elected from their party list. Yellow background denotes an electorate win by a list member, or other incumbent. A ✓ or ✗ denotes status of any incumbent, win or lose respectively.						
Party	Candidate	Votes	%	±%	Party votes	%	±%
Labour	Trevor Mallard	14,023	44.99		10,633	33.88	
National	Joy McLauchlan	11,567	37.11		10,562	33.65	
Alliance	Peter Love	2,125	6.82		3,314	10.56	
NZ First	Deborah Morris	2,042	6.55		2,618	8.34	
ACT	Christopher Milne	684	2.19		1,609	5.13	
McGillicuddy Serious	Alastair McGlinchy	228	0.73		102	0.32	
United NZ	Frank Owen	222	0.71		473	1.51	
Superannuitants & Youth	Jack Powell	163	0.52		53	0.17	
Natural Law	Angela Slade	65	0.21		14	0.04	
Independent	Brian Russell	53	0.17				
Christian Coalition					1,443	4.60	
Legalise Cannabis					382	1.22	
Animals First					61	0.19	
Progressive Green					47	0.15	
Asia Pacific United					21	0.07	
Green Society					15	0.05	
Ethnic Minority Party					14	0.04	
Libertarianz					10	0.03	
Mana Māori					9	0.03	
Conservatives					4	0.01	
Advance New Zealand					2	0.01	
Te Tawharau					1	0.00	
Informal votes		338			123		
Total valid votes		31,172			31,387		
Labour win new seat	Majority	2,456	7.88				
