= Normandale, New Zealand =

Suburb of Lower Hutt, New Zealand

Normandale
- Suburb
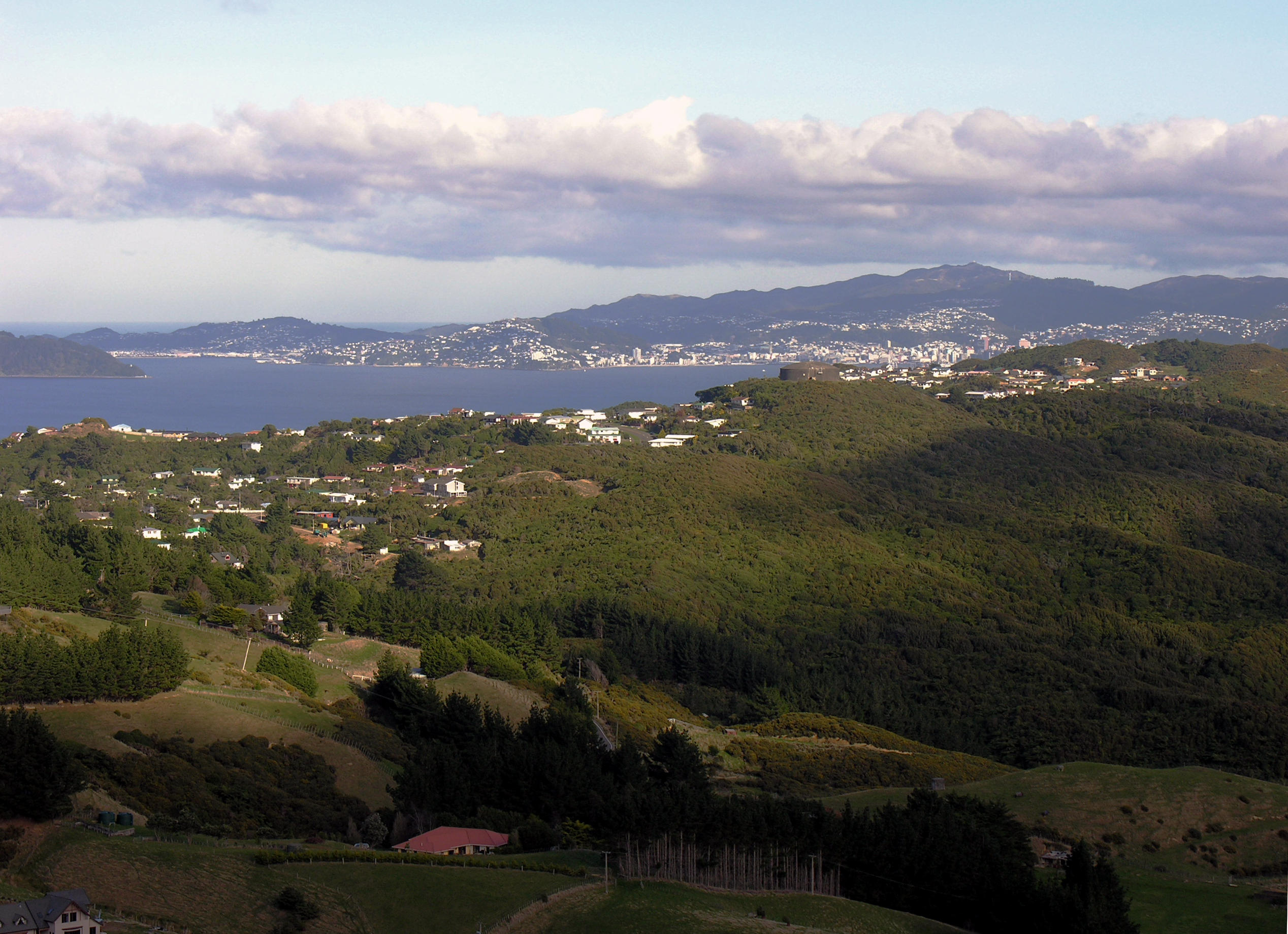
- View toward Wellington from the top of Normandale Road
- Interactive map of Normandale
- Coordinates: 41°12′09″S 174°53′32″E
- Country: New Zealand
- Region: Wellington Region
- City: Lower Hutt City
- Local authority: Hutt City Council
- Electoral ward: Western
- Established: 1901

Area
  - Land: 145 ha (360 acres)

Population (June 2025)
  - Total: 2,200
  - Density: 1,500/km^{2} (3,900/sq mi)

	Belmont Regional Park	Tirohanga
Maungaraki	Normandale	Harbour View
	Alicetown	Melling

Normandale is a semi-rural suburb of Lower Hutt City, New Zealand, on the western hills of the Hutt Valley. It consists of two main roads – Normandale Road and Miromiro Road – and the hills between, and is a five minute drive from the Lower Hutt city centre.

Normandale contains historic woodland reserve Jubilee Park and part of Belmont Regional Park, Wellington's largest Regional Park. It also has many other smaller sections of native bush reserve, so native birds are very common; since 2019 Kiwibank has funded the suburb to suppress bird-killing predators as part of New Zealand's Predator Free project. Normandale is home to a primary school, a Playcentre, a church, a cattery, and a dog boarding kennel, and is otherwise entirely residential. As an older suburb made up entirely of narrow and steep hills, it is dominated by trees.

== Geography ==
Normandale is defined by the area bordered by its two main roads: Normandale Road, starting with the bridge from Alicetown over State Highway 2 / Western Hutt Road and the Melling railway line; and Miromiro Road, which branches off after the bridge. Normandale Road is almost 4.5 kilometres long, whose top few kilometres, at around 200 m altitude, serves small farms and lifestyle blocks. It connects north to Sweetacres Drive, Belmont. From the top of Miromiro Road, Dowse Drive connects upward to Normandale's pair suburb Maungaraki, with Poto Road connecting back down to Normandale Road in the opposite direction. The other connecting roads meet Normandale Road: Pokohiwi Road to Pekanga Road in the middle, and Cottle Park Drive and Stratton Street at the upper end bordering Belmont Regional Park.

== Jubilee Park ==
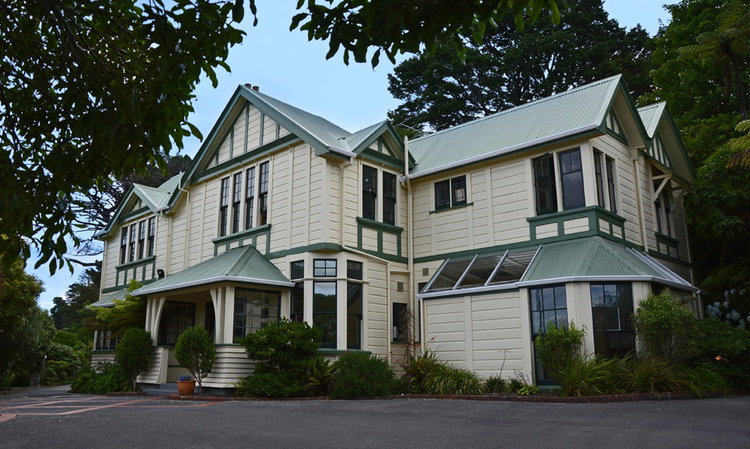
Minoh Friendship House

Jubilee Park opened in 1940 to commemorate Wellington's centenary (and the 50th anniversary of Lower Hutt a year later). Mostly consisting of native bush (and the birds who live there), it also includes sites of houses built in the 1890s, a replica pioneer hut with the original chimney, heritage plantings, picnic areas, bush walks, three lawns, and a roadside calisthenics station.

Jubilee Park contains Hutt Minoh Friendship House, a Heritage New Zealand category 1 building. Originally named Norbury, it was built in 1904 by Lower Hutt's first mayor William Fitzherbert, to house his daughter Alice and her husband George William von Zedlitz, Victoria University's first professor of modern languages. It was acquired by the City Council in 1945 to house the park caretaker. Today it is used to promote Japanese culture and Lower Hutt's link with its sister city Minoh, Osaka, whose mayor funded its restoration. It includes New Zealand's first kyūdō dojo.

== History ==
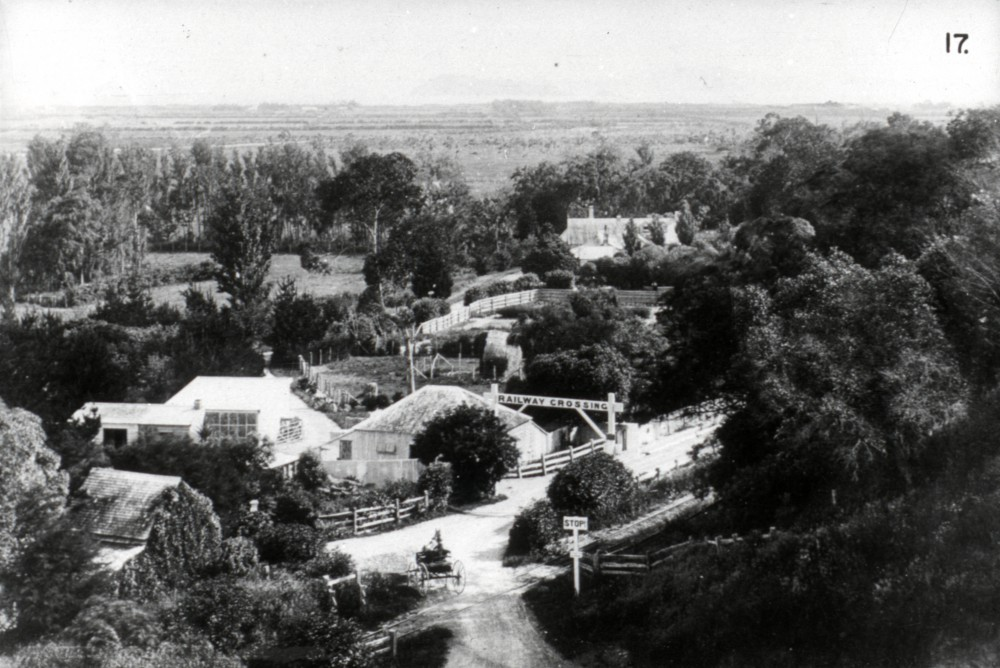
Normandale Road railway crossing c. 1880s. This crossing survived until the erection of the overbridge which provides access from Lower Hutt to Normandale. The photograph long predates the construction of the Western Hutt Road from Melling to Petone in 1938 – nowadays the State Highway 2 motorway.

=== Old Coach Road ===
Māori used two major routes between Porirua Harbour and Wellington Harbour. One of these, called the Old Coach Road by the European settlers, ran from the Pauatahanui arm of Porirua Harbour south over the hills, exiting through what is now Normandale, into the Hutt Valley. It was a proposed road connection between the two harbours in the 1850s, and was used by coaches until the mid 1880s when it was abandoned in preference to the Haywards Hill Road. Today Old Coach Road is part of the track system in Belmont Regional Park, and the section between the sealed Stratton Street end and Belmont Road junction is a Heritage New Zealand category 2 area.

=== Founding and development of the suburb ===
Normandale was founded in 1901 under the village settlement scheme of the Liberal Government, New Zealand's first political party government, along with its westerly neighbours Maungaraki and Korokoro. It was named after Ann Normandale, mother-in-law of Richard Seddon. It was initially part of Hutt County, and became a part of Lower Hutt City on 6 October 1957.

Substantial development took place during the 1960s and 1970s. The population was stable between 1996 and 2013, with few new dwellings and a decline in the average number of residents per dwelling.

== Demographics ==
Normandale statistical area covers 1.45 km^{2} (0.56 sq mi), and includes Harbour View. It had an estimated population of 2,200 as of June 2025, with a population density of 1,517 people per km^{2}.

Historical population
Year	Pop.	±% p.a.
2006	1,941	—
2013	1,938	−0.02%
2018	2,010	+0.73%
2023	2,082	+0.71%

Normandale had a population of 2,082 in the 2023 New Zealand census, an increase of 72 people (3.6%) since the 2018 census, and an increase of 144 people (7.4%) since the 2013 census. There were 1,053 males, 1,008 females, and 18 people of other genders in 741 dwellings. 4.6% of people identified as LGBTIQ+. The median age was 39.6 years (compared with 38.1 years nationally). There were 423 people (20.3%) aged under 15 years, 321 (15.4%) aged 15 to 29, 1,086 (52.2%) aged 30 to 64, and 249 (12.0%) aged 65 or older.

People could identify as more than one ethnicity. The results were 82.7% European (Pākehā); 9.9% Māori; 3.0% Pasifika; 14.0% Asian; 1.9% Middle Eastern, Latin American and African New Zealanders (MELAA); and 3.6% other, which includes people giving their ethnicity as "New Zealander". English was spoken by 97.6%, Māori by 1.7%, Samoan by 0.4%, and other languages by 15.7%. No language could be spoken by 1.9% (e.g. too young to talk). New Zealand Sign Language was known by 0.4%. The percentage of people born overseas was 26.5, compared with 28.8% nationally.

Religious affiliations were 29.5% Christian, 2.0% Hindu, 0.9% Islam, 0.3% Māori religious beliefs, 1.2% Buddhist, 0.4% New Age, 0.4% Jewish, and 2.6% other religions. People who answered that they had no religion were 57.3%, and 5.8% of people did not answer the census question.

Of those at least 15 years old, 642 (38.7%) people had a bachelor's or higher degree, 774 (46.7%) had a post-high school certificate or diploma, and 237 (14.3%) people exclusively held high school qualifications. The median income was $61,000, compared with $41,500 nationally. 411 people (24.8%) earned over $100,000 compared to 12.1% nationally. The employment status of those at least 15 was 1,023 (61.7%) full-time, 237 (14.3%) part-time, and 45 (2.7%) unemployed.

== Education ==
Normandale School is a co-educational state primary school for Year 1 to 6 students, with a roll of 132 as of July 2026. It opened in 1969.

A previous school opened in 1911 and closed in 1937. Its site is now the Normandale Playcentre.

== Views ==
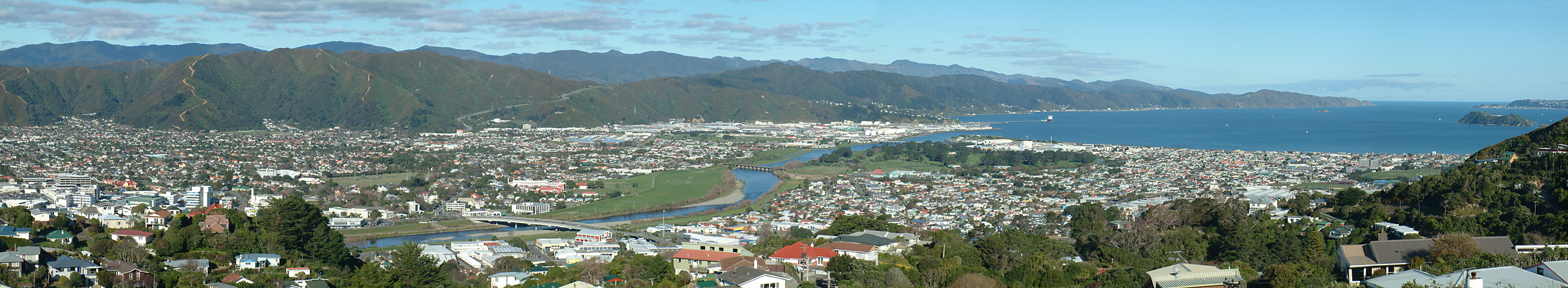
Panorama of Lower Hutt from upper Normandale

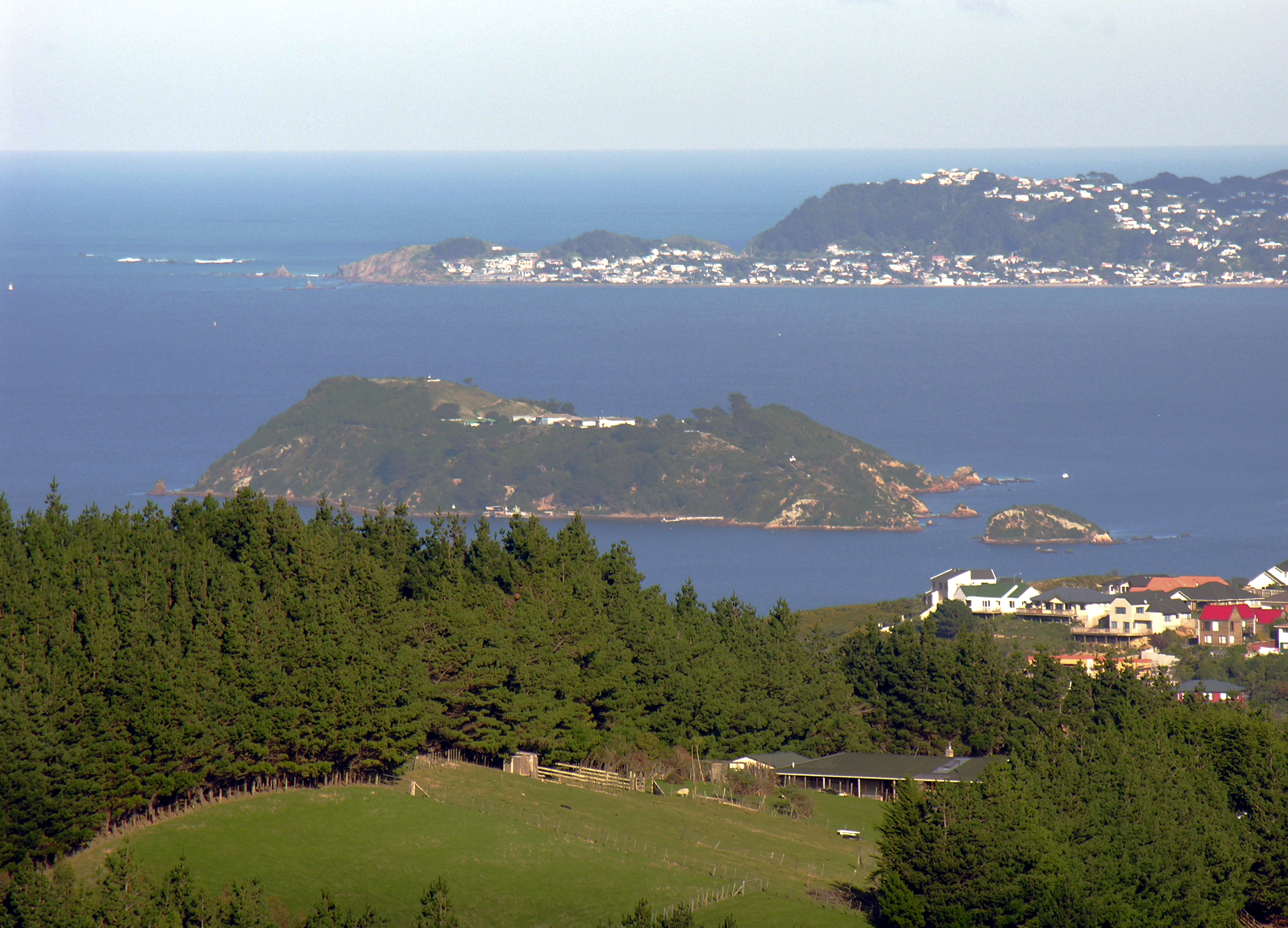
The view toward Matiu / Somes Island from the top of Normandale Road
