= Raphael House Rudolf Steiner School =

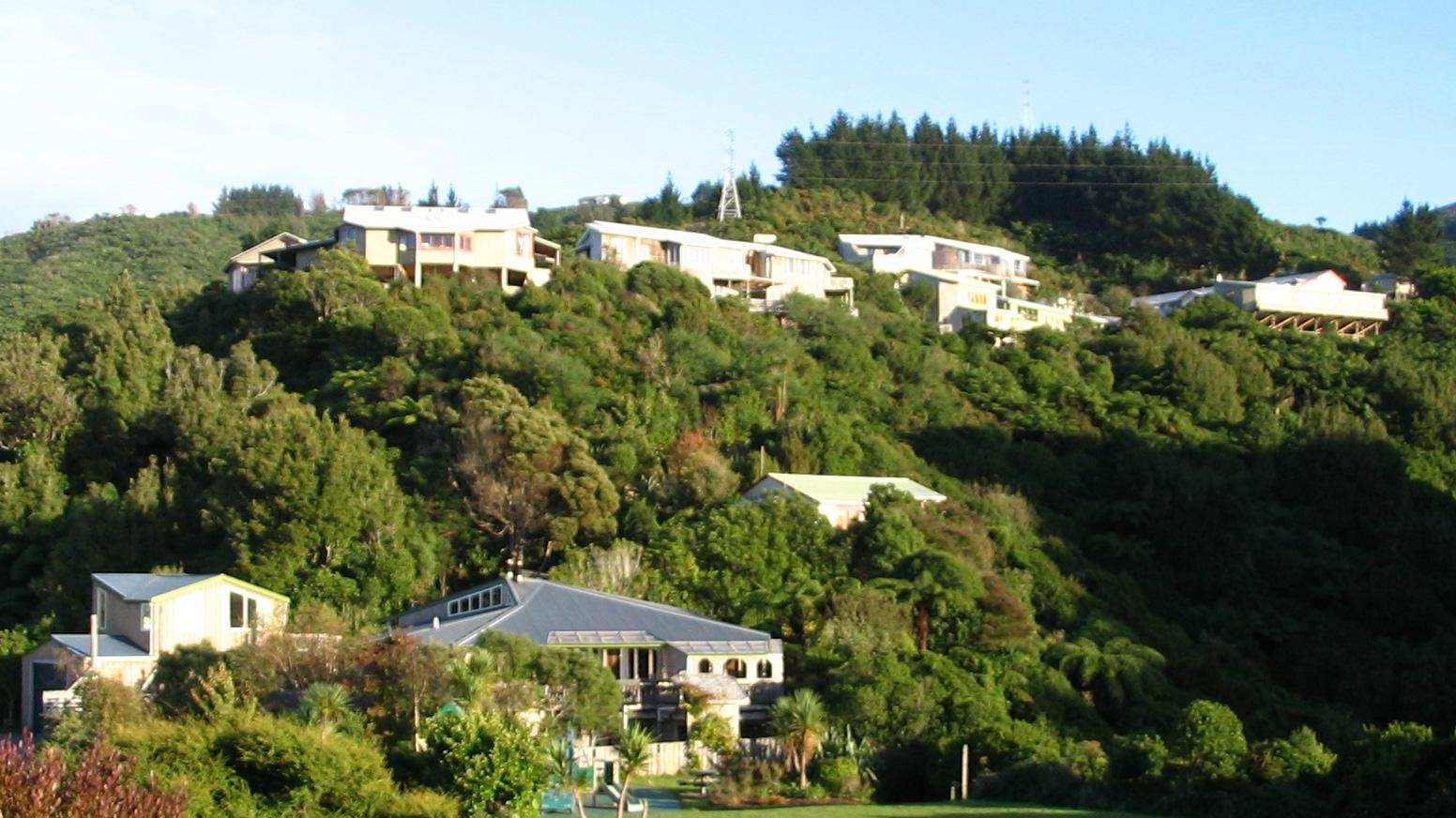
- Raphael House Rudolf Stenier School

Location
- 27 Matuhi Street, Tirohanga, Lower Hutt, New Zealand; 41.1954°S 174.9067°E

Information
- Type: State integrated, composite (Years 1–13)
- Established: June 1979
- Ministry of Education Institution no.: 133
- School Coordinator: Karyn Gray
- Enrolment: 282 (July 2026)
- Socio-economic decile: 10Z
- Website: raphaelhouse.school.nz

Raphael House Rudolf Steiner School is a coeducational, state integrated composite school in Tirohanga, Lower Hutt. It provides a Waldorf education for Years 1 to 13. Matriculation starts when children are 7 years of age.

== Curriculum ==
The school follows Rudolf Steiner's 3-stage pedagogical model of child development promoted in Waldorf education. The Raphael House Rudolf Steiner/Waldorf curriculum is cross-referred to the National Curriculum. In 2012 a new Level 3 NZQA approved qualification, known as the Steiner School Certificate, was offered to Class 12 (Year 13) students. From 2013 this qualification was offered at Levels 1, 2 and 3 of the New Zealand Qualifications Framework.

The Steiner School Certificate Level 3 has also been approved by Universities NZ, for University Entrance Ad Eundum Statum.

Foreign languages currently taught include:

- German
- Japanese

Most overseas student exchanges are with students from German Waldorf schools.

== Community ==
Raphael House offers evening adult education courses on subjects such as health, anthroposophy, and self-development, and provides a small number of rooms for community activities. The school issues a printed and online weekly newsletter called "The Bush Telegraph" to parents which disseminates pertinent community information and also offers advertising space.

== Festivals ==
Raphael House celebrates a number of Christian festivals, namely Easter, Advent, St Nicholas, and Christmas, as well as Midwinter and St Michael's day, as cultural experiences for students and their parents. Preparation for the feast days is considered an important part of the students' experience. For example, the students learn songs and make their own colourful lanterns in the days leading up to the Midwinter festival.

== Notable alumni ==
- Erice van Leuven – 2023 women's junior downhill UCI mountain bike world champion
- Anna Paquin – film and television actress, Oscar winner

== See also ==
- Curriculum of the Waldorf schools
