= Lower Hutt =

Lower Hutt Te Awa Kairangi ki Tai (Māori)
- City
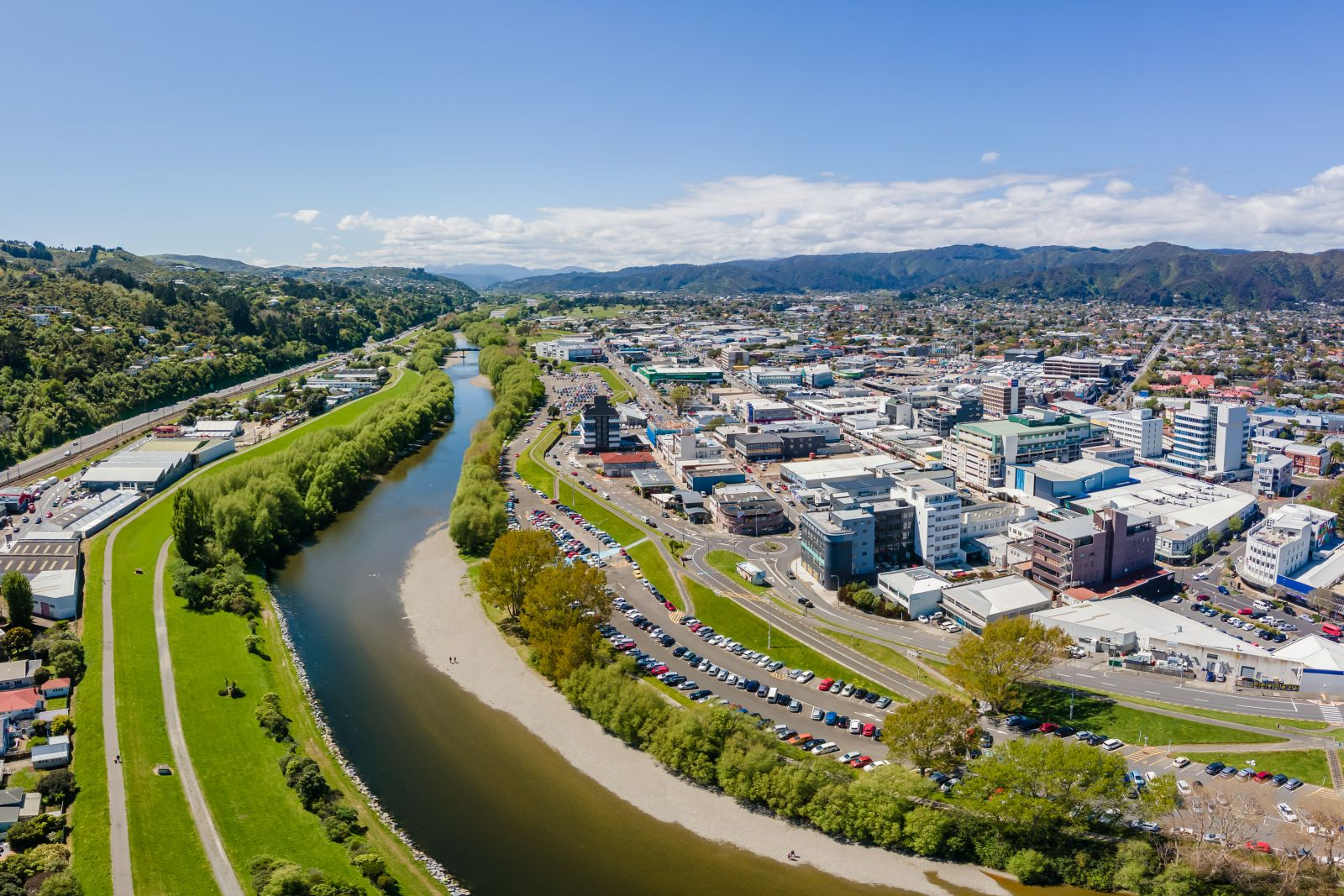
- Lower Hutt from the air, c. 2024

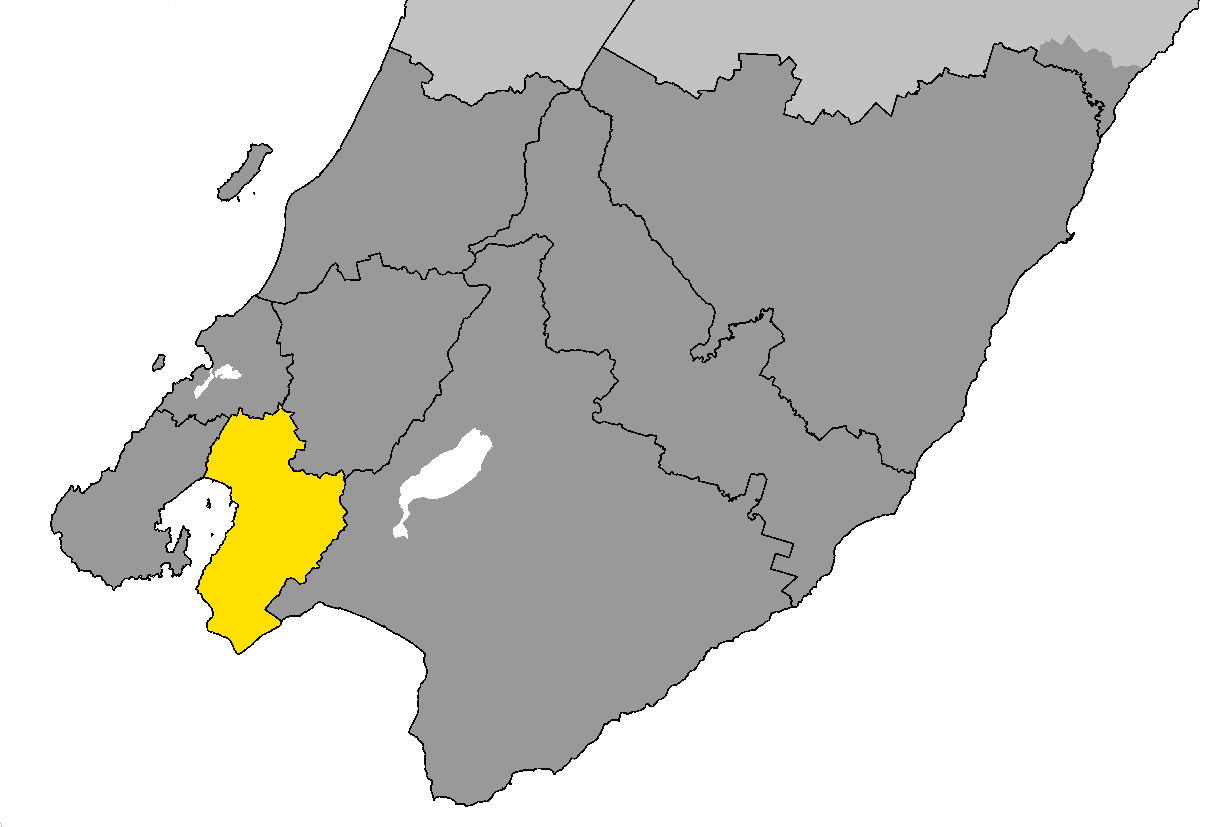
- Coordinates: 41°13′S 174°55′E
- Country: New Zealand
- Region: Wellington
- Wards: Western; Northern; Central; Eastern; Harbour; Wainuiomata
- Community Boards: Eastbourne; Petone; Wainuiomata
- Electorates: Hutt South (general); Remutaka (general); Te Tai Tonga (Māori); Ikaroa-Rāwhiti (Māori)
- Suburbs: List: Korokoro; Maungaraki; Normandale; Harbour View; Tirohanga; Belmont; Kelson; Petone; Ava; Alicetown; Melling; Boulcott; Avalon; Eastbourne; Seaview; Moera; Waiwhetū; Woburn; Waterloo; Fairfield; Epuni; Naenae; Taita; Stokes Valley; Wainuiomata

Government
  - Mayor: Ken Laban
  - MPs: Chris Bishop (National); Chris Hipkins (Labour); Tākuta Ferris (Te Pāti Māori); Cushla Tangaere-Manuel (Labour)
  - Territorial authority: Hutt City Council

Area
  - Territorial: 376.40 km^{2} (145.33 sq mi)
  - Urban: 78.54 km^{2} (30.32 sq mi)
  - Rural: 297.86 km^{2} (115.00 sq mi)

Population (June 2025)
  - Territorial: 114,200
  - Density: 303.4/km^{2} (785.8/sq mi)
  - Urban: 113,200
  - Urban density: 1,441/km^{2} (3,733/sq mi)
- Postcode(s): 5010, 5011, 5012, 5013, 5014, 5019
- Area code: 04
- Website: www.huttcity.govt.nz

Lower Hutt (Māori: Te Awa Kairangi ki Tai) is a city in the Wellington Region of New Zealand. Administered by the Hutt City Council, it is one of the four cities that constitute the Wellington metropolitan area.

It is New Zealand's sixth most populous city, with a population of 114,200. The total area administered by the council is 376.4 km^{2} (145 sq mi) around the lower half of the Hutt Valley and along the eastern shores of Wellington Harbour, of which 78.54 km^{2} (30 sq mi) is urban. It is separated from the city of Wellington by the harbour, and from Upper Hutt by the Taita Gorge.

Lower Hutt is unique among New Zealand cities, as the name of the council does not match the name of the city it governs. Special legislation has since 1991 given the council the name "Hutt City Council", while the name of the place itself remains "Lower Hutt City". This name has led to confusion, as Upper Hutt is administered by a separate city council, the Upper Hutt City Council. The entire Hutt Valley includes both Lower and Upper Hutt cities. Lower Hutt is also often simply called "the Hutt".

== History ==
Before European settlement, thick forest covered most of the Hutt Valley, with areas of marshland close to the river's mouth. Māori inhabited the shoreline, with a pā at each end of Petone beach.

Māori welcomed the arrival of the New Zealand Company ship Tory in 1839, and William Wakefield (the company's agent) negotiated with some local chiefs to allow settlement. The first immigrant ship, the Aurora, arrived on 22 January 1840, an event still commemorated every year on the Monday closest as Wellington's Anniversary Day. A settlement, Britannia, grew up close to the mouth of the Hutt River (Te Awa Kairangi in Māori language), and settlers set up New Zealand's first newspaper and bank.

The city takes its name from the English name given to the river, named after one of the founding members, director and chairman of the New Zealand Company, Sir William Hutt. The dual name of Hutt River Te Awa Kairangi has been used since 2010.

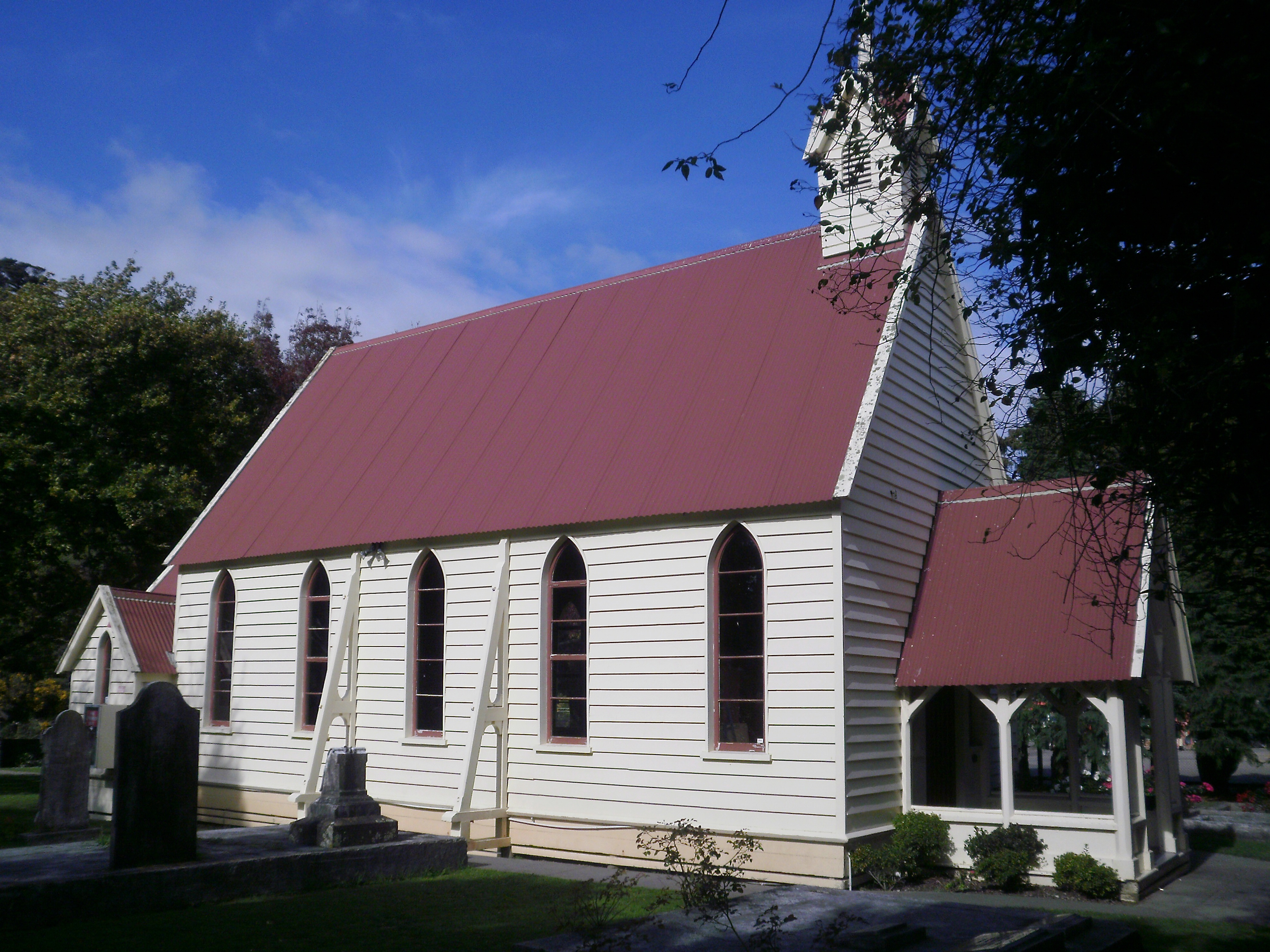
Christ Church, Taitā, built in 1853 – the oldest extant church in the Wellington region

Within weeks of settlement the Hutt River flooded, and in March 1840 the majority of Britannia settlers decided to move to Thorndon, (as of 2013 in the heart of Wellington city), though some settlers remained at the north end of the harbour. In the 1840s an area on the west bank of the Hutt River, in what is now Alicetown, formed the village then known as Aglionby.

In 1846, conflict arose between European settlers and Māori, which led to armed conflict in the Hutt Valley Campaign.

The 1855 Wairarapa earthquake (in the range of magnitude 8.1 to 8.3) raised part of the lower valley, allowing reclamation of land from swamp. The fault escarpment from the earthquake is still visible, notably at Hutt Central School.

On New Year's Day 1859, the first permanent lighthouse to be built in New Zealand was lit at Pencarrow Head. New Zealand's only female lighthouse keeper, Mary Jane Bennett, became the inaugural operator of the lighthouse.

The railway line from central Wellington reached Lower Hutt station (subsequently Western Hutt) in April 1874, with the line running north up the west side of the Hutt River to Silverstream opening two years later.

Before the Second World War of 1939–1945, urban settlement in the lower Hutt Valley concentrated mainly on Petone, central Lower Hutt and Eastbourne, with a total population of 30,000. In 1927, the Public Works Department completed the construction of a branch railway line to Waterloo on the east side of the river; the route diverging from the main line between Lower Hutt and Petone. Two years later the railway workshops moved from Petone to a new larger site off the new branch at Woburn.

In the late 1940s, new suburbs of state housing developed along the eastern side of the Hutt Valley, from Waiwhetū to Taitā (then known as Taita), to alleviate nationwide housing shortages and to cater for the booming population. Between 1946 and 1954, the railway line from Waterloo extended through these new suburbs to Haywards, becoming the main line in 1954 when the existing main line between Haywards and Melling closed. By the end of the 1950s, Lower Hutt had a population of 80,000.

== Government ==
=== Local ===
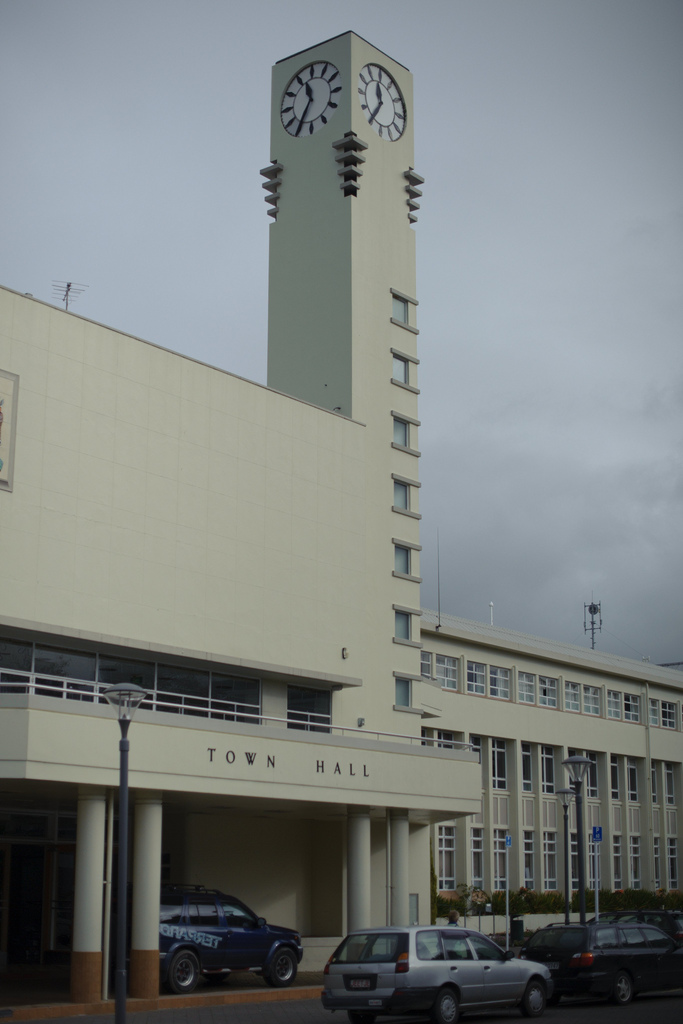
2011 photo of the Lower Hutt town hall

The Hutt City Council comprises a mayor and 12 councillors. The current mayor is Campbell Barry, who was first elected in 2019 succeeding Ray Wallace. At the time of his election, Barry was New Zealand's youngest ever mayor. The city's six electoral wards (Northern, Western, Central, Eastern, Harbour and Wainuiomata) each elect one councillor, with the remaining six councillors elected at-large.

Mayor and councillors elected in the 2022 local-body elections:

Name	Affiliation (if any)	Notes
Campbell Barry	Labour	Mayor of Lower Hutt
Tui Lewis	Independent	Deputy Mayor, Ward: Harbour
Glenda Barratt	Independent United Hutt	Ward: Central
Chris Parkin	Independent	Ward: Western
Naomi Shaw	Independent	Ward: Northern
Andy Mitchell	Independent	Ward: Eastern
Keri Brown	Labour	Ward: Wainuiomata
Tony Stallinger	Independent United Hutt	Ward: At-large
Josh Briggs	Independent	Ward: At-large
Brady Dyer	Independent	Ward: At-large
Karen Morgan	Independent	Ward: At-large
Gabriel Tupou	Independent	Ward: At-large
Simon Edwards	Independent	Ward: At-large

Neighbouring councils are Wellington City Council (adjoining to the west), Porirua City Council to the north, Upper Hutt City Council to the north-east and South Wairarapa District Council to the east. The boundaries of the Lower Hutt city local body have evolved from a series of amalgamations and boundary changes over the years.

The Hutt County Council, established in 1877, covered the region from Wellington's south coast up to Waikanae, excluding the Wellington City Council area. As the region grew, urban parts of the Hutt County became autonomous boroughs: Petone in 1888, Lower Hutt in 1891, Eastbourne in 1906, Johnsonville in 1908, Upper Hutt in 1908, Porirua in 1962 and Kapiti in 1974. In 1941 Lower Hutt became a city. It incorporated Normandale in 1957.

In 1987–1989 the New Zealand Government forced local authorities to consolidate, which led to Lower Hutt amalgamating with the adjacent Boroughs of Petone and Eastbourne and with the Wainuiomata District (which had its independence for barely a year), and to the abolition of the Hutt County Council.

=== National ===
The area of Lower Hutt is covered by two general electorates (Hutt South and Remutaka) and by two Māori electorates (Ikaroa-Rāwhiti in the north and Te Tai Tonga in the south).

== Geography ==
The city centres on the lower southern valley of the Hutt River, to the northeast of the city of Wellington. The valley widens into a delta as the river nears its mouth, so the central urban area of the city forms a triangle with its longest side along the shoreline. In the upper reaches of the city the Western and Eastern Hutt Hills become closer, culminating in the Taitā Gorge at the northern end of Lower Hutt, separating the city from neighbouring Upper Hutt.

Lower Hutt includes the cluster of small settlements that extend down the eastern coast of Wellington Harbour. These include the two large townships of Wainuiomata and Eastbourne. The city also includes a large area of sparsely populated land to the east of the harbour, extending to Pencarrow Head and into the Remutaka Range. Lower Hutt's boundaries also include the islands in Wellington Harbour, the largest of which is Matiu / Somes Island.

=== Climate ===
Lower Hutt has a wet oceanic climate (Köppen climate classification: Cfb), which is similar to nearby Wellington, with relatively warm summers and mild winters with the occasional storm.

Climate data for Lower Hutt
Month	Jan	Feb	Mar	Apr	May	Jun	Jul	Aug	Sep	Oct	Nov	Dec	Year
Record high °C (°F)	28.8 (83.8)	30.9 (87.6)	28.6 (83.5)	26.5 (79.7)	23.0 (73.4)	19.6 (67.3)	18.2 (64.8)	20.1 (68.2)	24.3 (75.7)	23.6 (74.5)	27.5 (81.5)	29.6 (85.3)	30.9 (87.6)
Mean daily maximum °C (°F)	22.5 (72.5)	22.6 (72.7)	20.9 (69.6)	18.4 (65.1)	15.9 (60.6)	13.4 (56.1)	12.8 (55.0)	13.8 (56.8)	15.7 (60.3)	16.9 (62.4)	18.7 (65.7)	20.7 (69.3)	17.7 (63.8)
Daily mean °C (°F)	18.2 (64.8)	18.3 (64.9)	16.6 (61.9)	14.1 (57.4)	12.1 (53.8)	9.9 (49.8)	9.0 (48.2)	9.9 (49.8)	11.6 (52.9)	13.0 (55.4)	14.5 (58.1)	16.7 (62.1)	13.7 (56.6)
Mean daily minimum °C (°F)	14.0 (57.2)	14.0 (57.2)	12.2 (54.0)	9.8 (49.6)	8.3 (46.9)	6.3 (43.3)	5.2 (41.4)	6.0 (42.8)	7.6 (45.7)	9.1 (48.4)	10.4 (50.7)	12.8 (55.0)	9.6 (49.3)
Record low °C (°F)	5.2 (41.4)	5.0 (41.0)	4.6 (40.3)	2.5 (36.5)	−1.0 (30.2)	−1.9 (28.6)	−3.3 (26.1)	−1.1 (30.0)	−2.2 (28.0)	0.8 (33.4)	2.1 (35.8)	5.0 (41.0)	−3.3 (26.1)
Average precipitation mm (inches)	84 (3.3)	81 (3.2)	87 (3.4)	88 (3.5)	117 (4.6)	154 (6.1)	144 (5.7)	136 (5.4)	109 (4.3)	145 (5.7)	99 (3.9)	94 (3.7)	1,338 (52.8)
Mean monthly sunshine hours	235	199	198	159	135	105	124	146	156	176	192	204	2,029
Source: Paradise.net

=== Te Awa Kairangi / Hutt River ===
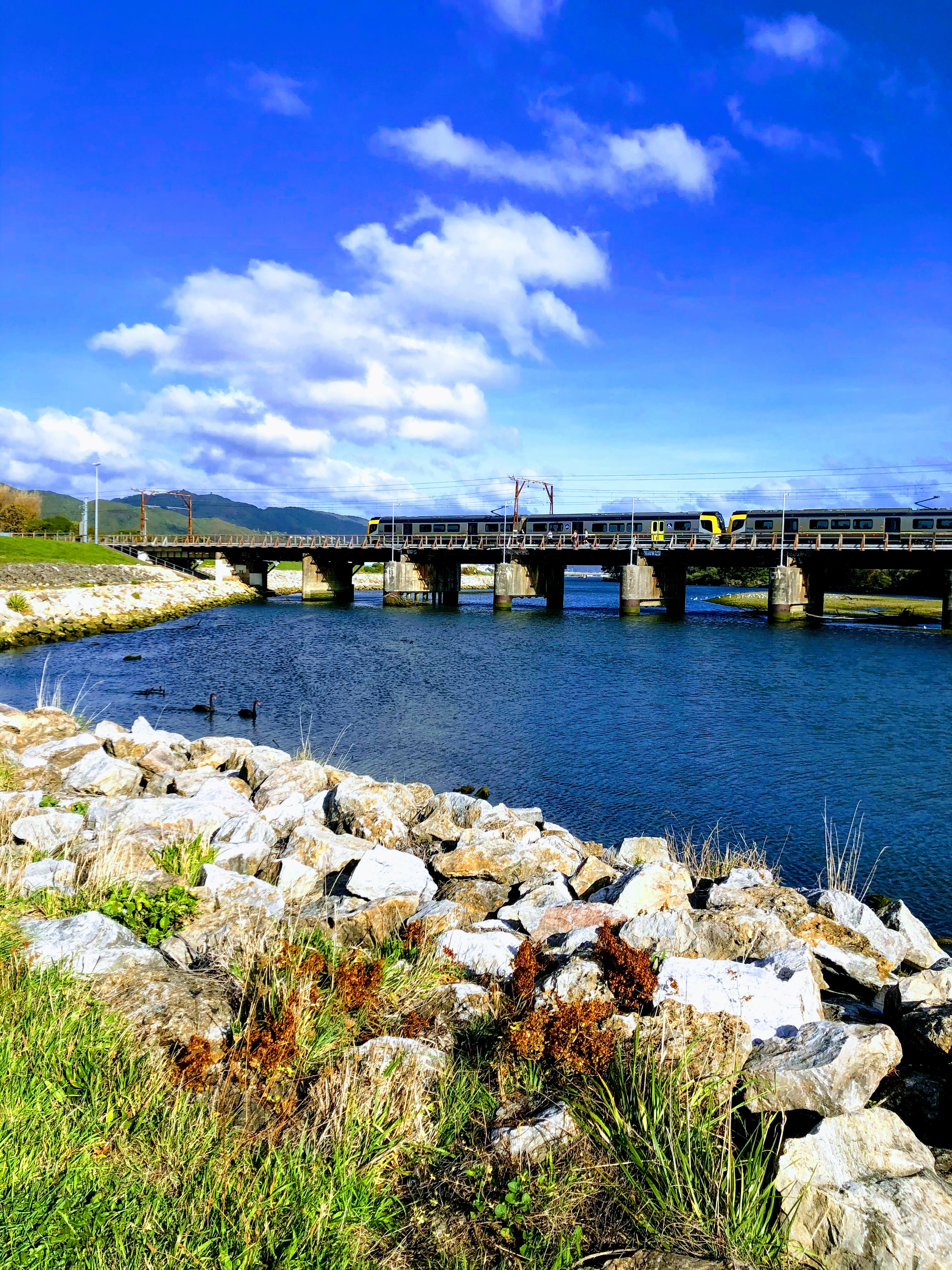
Te Awa Kairangi Hutt River Looking downstream

A single major aquifer dominates the lower Hutt Valley: the river, originally named Heretaunga, and since 2010 known as "Te Awa Kairangi / Hutt River". Awakairangi in the Māori language means "river of food from the sky".

Lower Hutt occupies the lower regions of the flood plain of the river, one of the most significant features of the city. In the 20th century the Hutt River Board built stopbanks to contain the river, but the threat of flooding from heavy rainfall persists. In 1985 the river burst its banks, and since then floods have been on a smaller scale. Smaller streams and storm-water drains have also caused occasional problems when rainfall exceeds average levels.

Much of the land adjacent to the river is protected as reserve by the City Council and managed by the Greater Wellington Regional Council to provide popular recreational areas. From the river mouth, walking and cycling trails and grassed areas occur at various points along both sides of the river up the Hutt Valley to Te Mārua, 28 km further north in Upper Hutt.

With lower river-levels in mid-summer, algal blooms have contributed to making slow-flowing areas anoxic. The Regional Council has cited the algal blooms as the cause of death of a small number of dogs swimming in the river, as well as of skin reactions in the case of swimmers.

Seven bridges cross the Hutt River within the city of Lower Hutt, with several other bridges built and replaced from the 1850s onwards.

== RiverLink Project ==
The RiverLink Project is a Hutt City project to provide flood protection on the Hutt River, and requires alteration to the Melling railway station and the roads around Melling from the Melling Bridge to the Western Hutt Road. A new traffic layout was trialled in 2026.

== Tributaries ==
Tributaries of the Hutt River within Lower Hutt include:

- Te Mome Stream
- Opahu Stream (Black Creek)

=== Suburbs ===
Here are listed the following suburbs of Lower Hutt City (unofficial suburbs are in italics).

Northern Ward
Pomare; (Note: Suburbs east of the Hutt River) Stokes Valley; Taitā

Western Ward
Haywards; (Note: Suburbs west of the Hutt River) Manor Park; Kelson; Belmont; Tirohanga; Harbour View; Melling; Normandale; Maungaraki; Alicetown

Central Ward
Avalon; Boulcott; Epuni; Lower Hutt Central; Woburn

Eastern Ward
Wingate; Naenae; Fairfield; Waterloo;

Harbour Ward – Petone Community Board
Ava; Korokoro; Petone; Waiwhetū; Moera; Gracefield; Seaview;

Harbour Ward – Eastbourne Community Board
Point Howard; (Note: Suburbs from the Eastern Harbour) Sorrento Bay; Lowry Bay; York Bay; Māhina Bay; Sunshine Bay; Days Bay; Eastbourne

Wainuiomata Ward
Wainuiomata; Wainuiomata Coast; Pencarrow Head; Arakura; Homedale Village; Wainuiomata West; Glendale

== Demographics ==
Lower Hutt City covers 376.40 km^{2} (145.33 sq mi) and had an estimated population of 114,200 as of June 2025, with a population density of 303 people per km^{2}.

The city's population has remained stable from the 1990s to the 2013 census. In the five years between the 2013 and 2018 censuses, the population grew steadily across the city with an increasing amount of homes being purchased and the area seen as more affordable comparable to the rest of the region.

Historical population for the territorial area
Year	Pop.	±% p.a.
1996	98,300	—
2001	98,600	+0.06%
2006	97,701	−0.18%
2013	98,238	+0.08%
2018	104,532	+1.25%
2023	107,562	+0.57%

Lower Hutt City had a population of 107,562 in the 2023 New Zealand census, an increase of 3,030 people (2.9%) since the 2018 census, and an increase of 9,324 people (9.5%) since the 2013 census. There were 53,082 males, 54,009 females and 468 people of other genders in 39,279 dwellings. 3.8% of people identified as LGBTIQ+. The median age was 37.5 years (compared with 38.1 years nationally). There were 20,595 people (19.1%) aged under 15 years, 19,896 (18.5%) aged 15 to 29, 51,261 (47.7%) aged 30 to 64, and 15,807 (14.7%) aged 65 or older.

Largest groups of overseas-born residents
Nationality	Population (2018)
England	4,083
India	3,183
China	2,310
Samoa	2,310
Philippines	1,488
Australia	1,404
Fiji	1,260
South Africa	1,131
Scotland	669
United States	543

People could identify as more than one ethnicity. The results were 64.3% European (Pākehā); 19.6% Māori; 12.2% Pasifika; 18.6% Asian; 2.1% Middle Eastern, Latin American and African New Zealanders (MELAA); and 2.1% other, which includes people giving their ethnicity as "New Zealander". English was spoken by 95.1%, Māori language by 5.1%, Samoan by 4.2% and other languages by 17.8%. No language could be spoken by 2.3% (e.g. too young to talk). New Zealand Sign Language was known by 0.6%. The percentage of people born overseas was 27.6, compared with 28.8% nationally.

Religious affiliations were 33.9% Christian, 4.5% Hindu, 1.4% Islam, 1.1% Māori religious beliefs, 1.3% Buddhist, 0.4% New Age, 0.1% Jewish, and 1.8% other religions. People who answered that they had no religion were 49.6%, and 6.1% of people did not answer the census question.

Of those at least 15 years old, 19,188 (22.1%) people had a bachelor's or higher degree, 42,231 (48.6%) had a post-high school certificate or diploma, and 20,148 (23.2%) people exclusively held high school qualifications. The median income was $47,800, compared with $41,500 nationally. 13,125 people (15.1%) earned over $100,000 compared to 12.1% nationally. The employment status of those at least 15 was that 48,201 (55.4%) people were employed full-time, 10,395 (12.0%) were part-time, and 2,694 (3.1%) were unemployed.

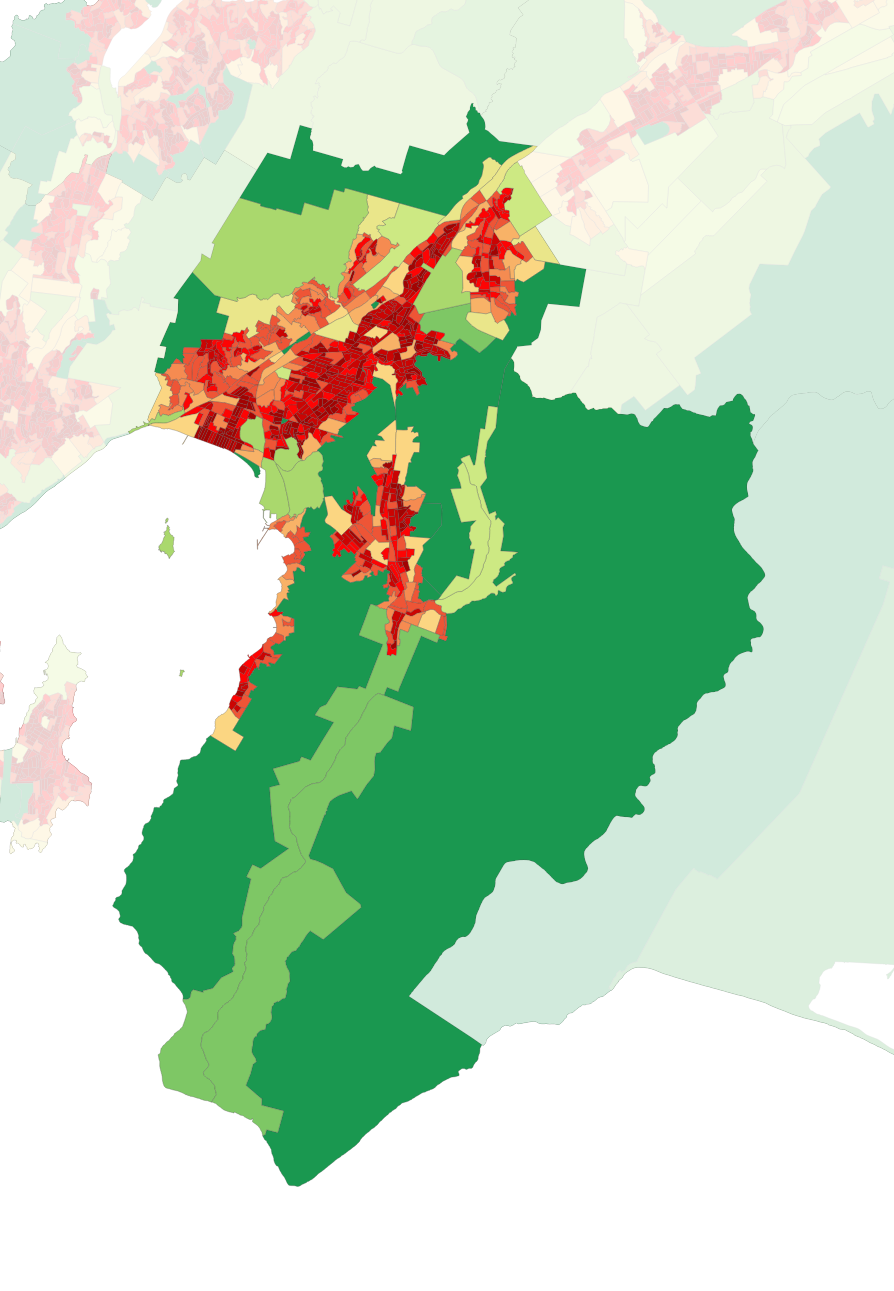
Population density in the 2023 census

Individual wards
Name	Area (km^{2})	Population	Density (per km^{2})	Dwellings	Median age	Median income
Western Ward	44.49	16,491	371	5,892	38.7 years	$58,400
Harbour Ward	25.55	19,158	750	7,794	41.0 years	$51,400
Northern Ward	18.30	16,584	906	5,736	34.6 years	$43,300
Central Ward	7.72	17,643	2,285	6,753	41.4 years	$46,000
Eastern Ward	14.43	18,087	1,253	6,471	35.8 years	$42,100
Wainuiomata Ward	265.91	19,599	74	6,636	34.6 years	$47,200
New Zealand					38.1 years	$41,500

=== Urban area ===
Lower Hutt's urban area covers 78.54 km^{2} (30.32 sq mi) and had an estimated population of 113,200 as of June 2025, with a population density of 1,441 people per km^{2}.

Historical population for the urban area
Year	Pop.	±% p.a.
2013	97,317	—
2018	103,545	+1.25%
2023	106,530	+0.57%

Lower Hutt had a population of 106,530 in the 2023 New Zealand census, an increase of 2,985 people (2.9%) since the 2018 census, and an increase of 9,213 people (9.5%) since the 2013 census. There were 52,563 males, 53,505 females and 465 people of other genders in 38,895 dwellings. 3.9% of people identified as LGBTIQ+. The median age was 37.4 years (compared with 38.1 years nationally). There were 20,415 people (19.2%) aged under 15 years, 19,740 (18.5%) aged 15 to 29, 50,733 (47.6%) aged 30 to 64, and 15,642 (14.7%) aged 65 or older.

People could identify as more than one ethnicity. The results were 64.1% European (Pākehā); 19.7% Māori; 12.3% Pasifika; 18.7% Asian; 2.1% Middle Eastern, Latin American and African New Zealanders (MELAA); and 2.0% other, which includes people giving their ethnicity as "New Zealander". English was spoken by 95.1%, Māori language by 5.1%, Samoan by 4.3% and other languages by 17.9%. No language could be spoken by 2.3% (e.g. too young to talk). New Zealand Sign Language was known by 0.6%. The percentage of people born overseas was 27.7, compared with 28.8% nationally.

Religious affiliations were 34.0% Christian, 4.5% Hindu, 1.4% Islam, 1.1% Māori religious beliefs, 1.3% Buddhist, 0.4% New Age, 0.1% Jewish, and 1.8% other religions. People who answered that they had no religion were 49.4%, and 6.1% of people did not answer the census question.

Of those at least 15 years old, 19,026 (22.1%) people had a bachelor's or higher degree, 41,766 (48.5%) had a post-high school certificate or diploma, and 19,980 (23.2%) people exclusively held high school qualifications. The median income was $47,800, compared with $41,500 nationally. 12,957 people (15.0%) earned over $100,000 compared to 12.1% nationally. The employment status of those at least 15 was that 47,736 (55.4%) people were employed full-time, 10,263 (11.9%) were part-time, and 2,679 (3.1%) were unemployed.

== Economy ==
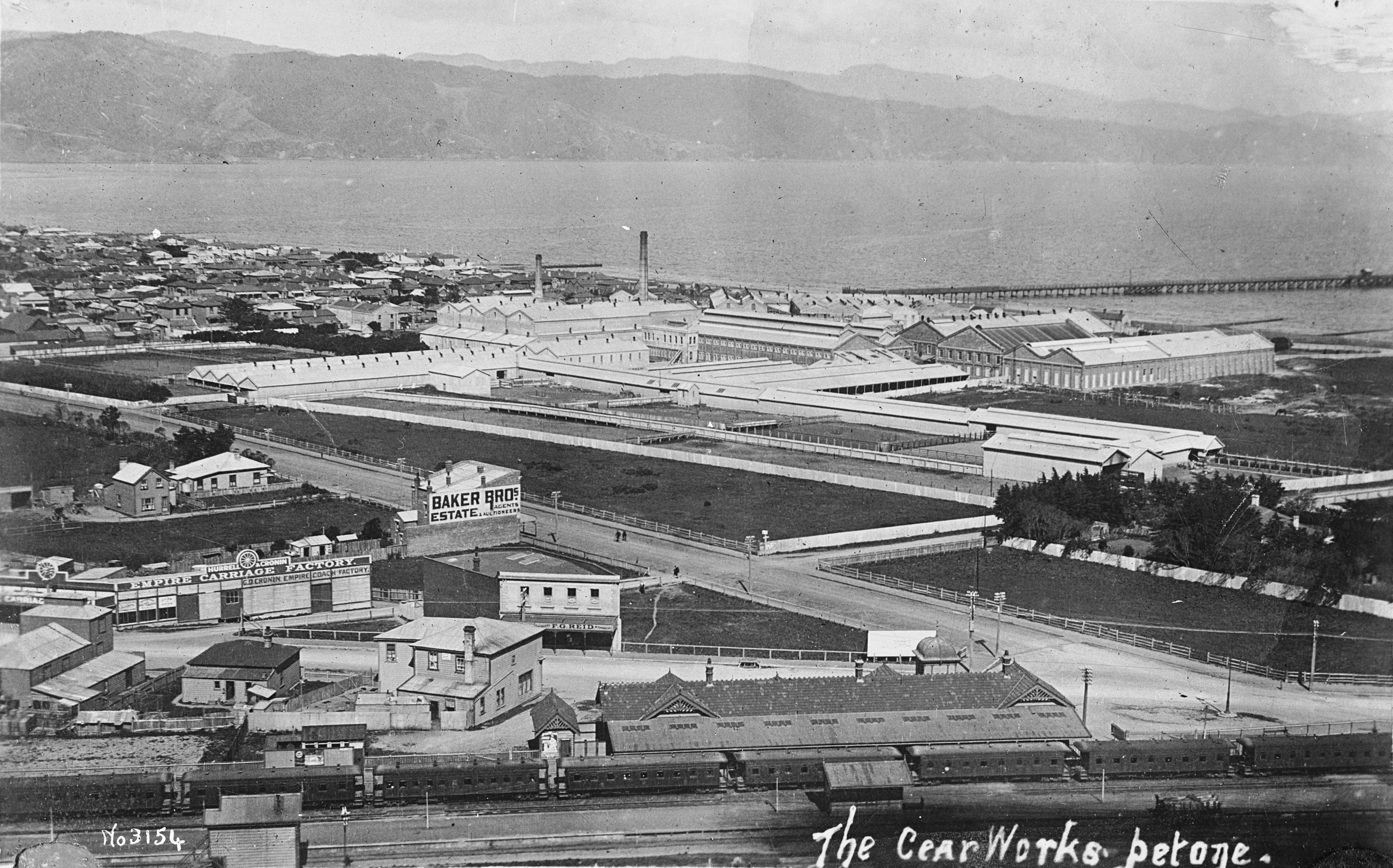
Early 1900s photo taken from Korokoro looking down on Petone and the Gear Meat Company

Historically, Petone, Seaview and Gracefield have been the main area for industry in the Wellington region, with industries including meat processing and freezing, motor vehicle assembly, and timber processing. As businesses have taken advantage of global manufacturing efficiencies, much of this large scale industry has changed to smaller design-led and medium-sized industries exporting to the world. Over the past 25 years service, distribution, and consumer-oriented sectors have increased. Lower Hutt remains the main location for light industrial activity in the Wellington Region.

Until post-war housing development took over, the central and northern areas of the city were largely market gardens.

In 2010 the lower reaches of the Waiwhetū Stream was cleaned up to remove toxins from decades of industry use. The channel was also widened to better protect against floods and native plantings and management has seen native waterlife and birds return to their habitat.

Petone's Jackson Street and neighbouring areas have seen a resurgence in to one of Wellington's most popular retail and hospitality areas.

Lower Hutt has one of the greatest proportions of science, technology and high value manufacturing businesses in New Zealand. Crown Research Institute GNS Science and New Zealand's innovation centre and business accelerator Callaghan Innovation are based in Lower Hutt, along with over 800 research organisations in high-end manufacturing, research and technology.

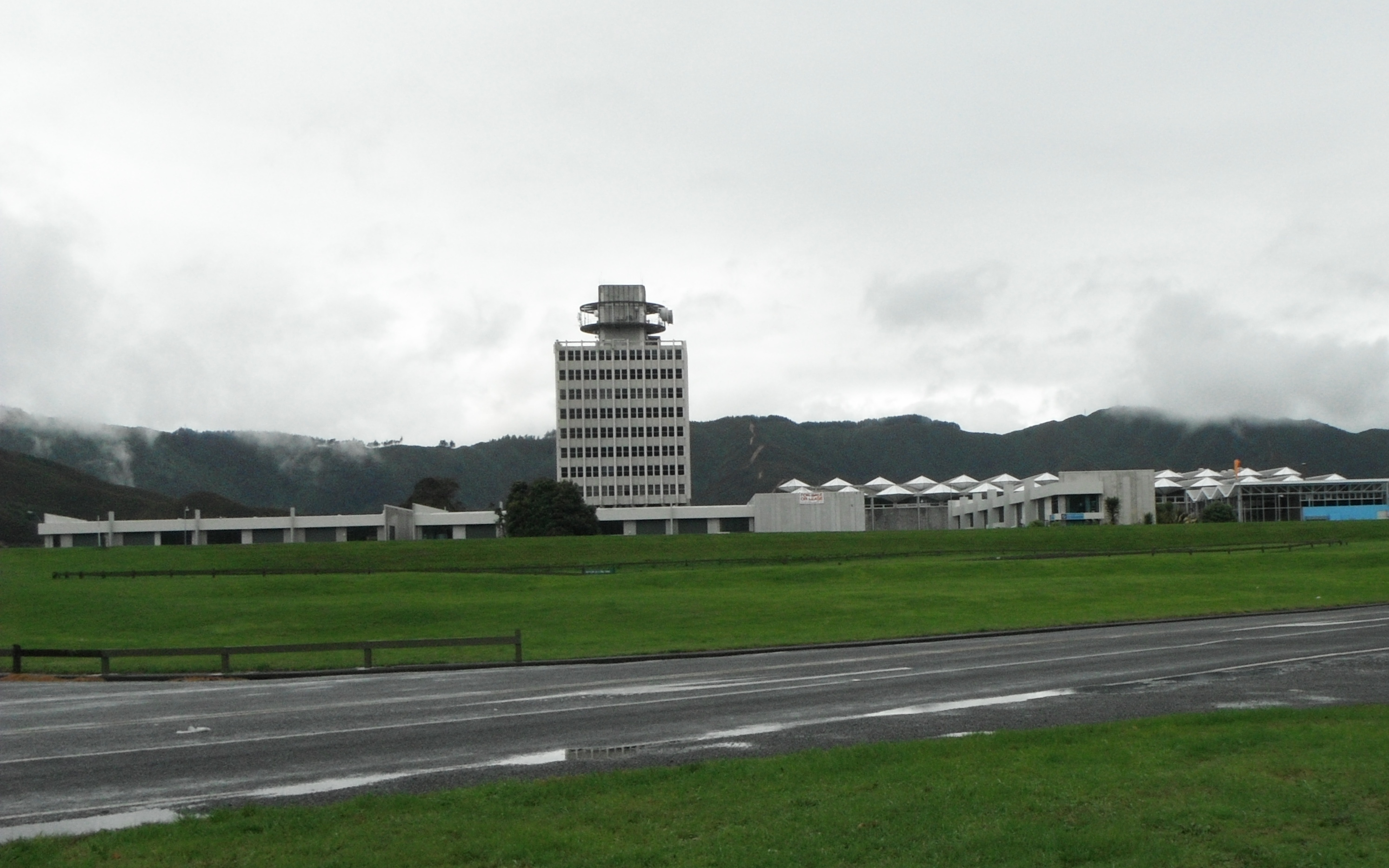
Avalon TV Studios from Harcourt Werry Drive

The suburb of Avalon was home to New Zealand's television industry from 1975 until the late 1980s. The Avalon film and television studios were New Zealand's first purpose-built television studios, and Avalon is the largest television studio complex in Australasia. The studios were home to Television One from 1975 to 1980, when it merged with South Pacific Television to form Television New Zealand (TVNZ). After 1989 most of TVNZ's operations moved to Auckland, and the studios were eventually sold off in 2012 to a consortium of Wellington investors. Avalon continues to operate independently with seven film and television studios used primarily as a feature film production base.

A large proportion of Lower Hutt's residents commute to the mainly commercial, service and government offices in Wellington City 12 km to the south-west.

== Culture and leisure ==
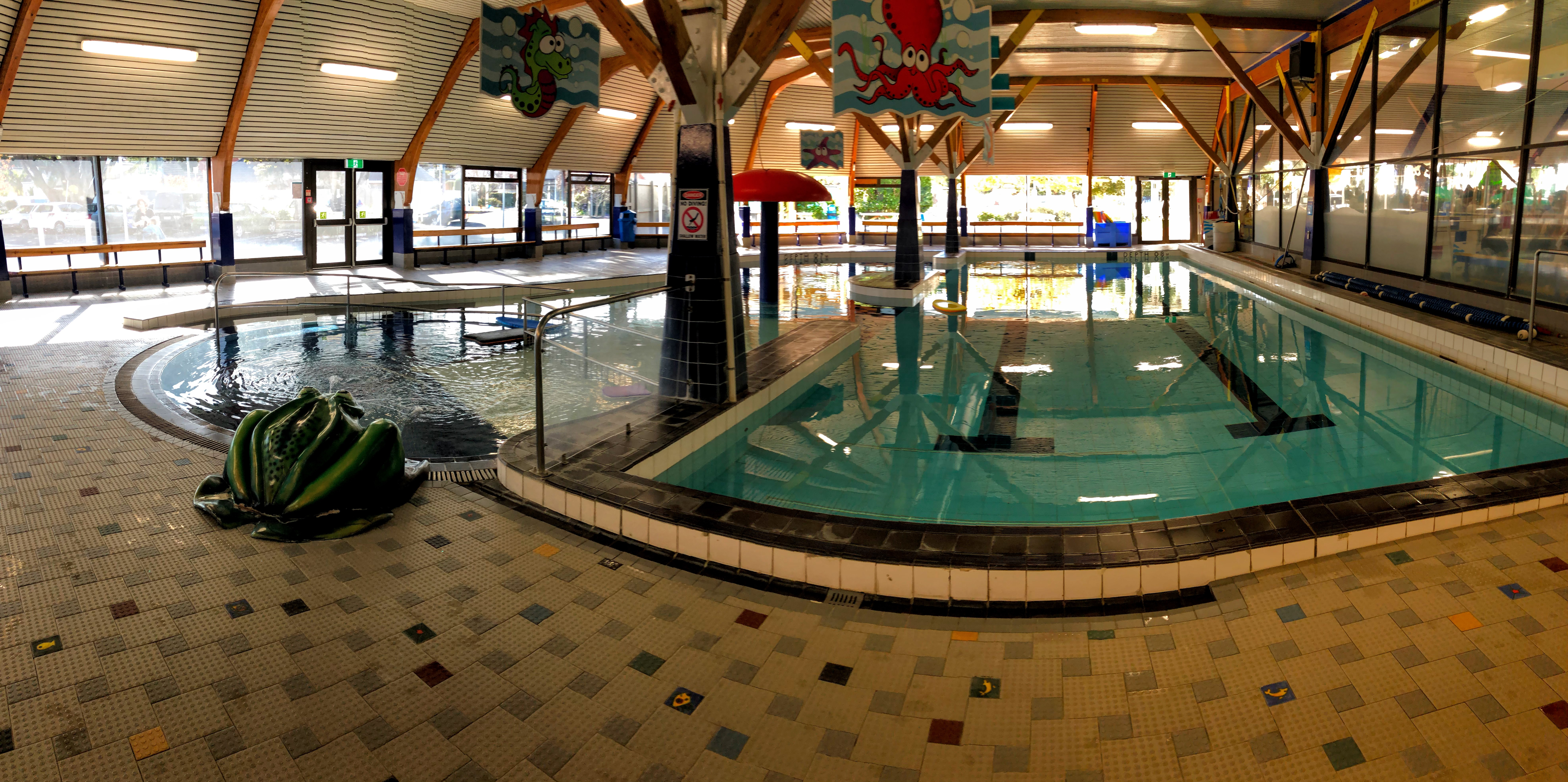
Children's pool at Huia Pool + Fitness

Several education and research facilities of national significance are in the southern half of the city. Cultural facilities include the Petone Settlers Museum, War Memorial Library, Dowse Art Museum and Vogel House.

The city possesses civic administration buildings constructed in the 1950s that are regarded as representative architecture of the era. A building of national significance is Vogel House, a two-storey wooden residence that was the official residence of the Prime Minister of New Zealand for much of the 20th century. It is a prime example of early colonial architecture in New Zealand and operates today as a tourist attraction.

The city is popular for outdoor sports, especially mountain biking, hiking, recreational walking and fishing. The central city is home to Queensgate Shopping Centre, the largest shopping centre in the lower North Island. The Riverbank car park adjacent to the central city is home to a Saturday produce market.

Among the filming locations for The Lord of the Rings directed by Peter Jackson, Dry Creek quarry, which dominates the hills above the suburb of Taitā, became the site for a huge medieval castle built for scenes of Helm's Deep and Minas Tirith.

== Education ==
Lower Hutt has four state secondary schools: Taita College, Naenae College, Hutt Valley High School and Wainuiomata High School. Other secondary schools include Chilton Saint James School, a private girls school; Raphael House Rudolf Steiner School, a state integrated Waldorf education school; Sacred Heart College, a state integrated Catholic girls school; St Bernard's College, a state integrated Catholic boys school; and St Oran's College, a state integrated Presbyterian girls school.

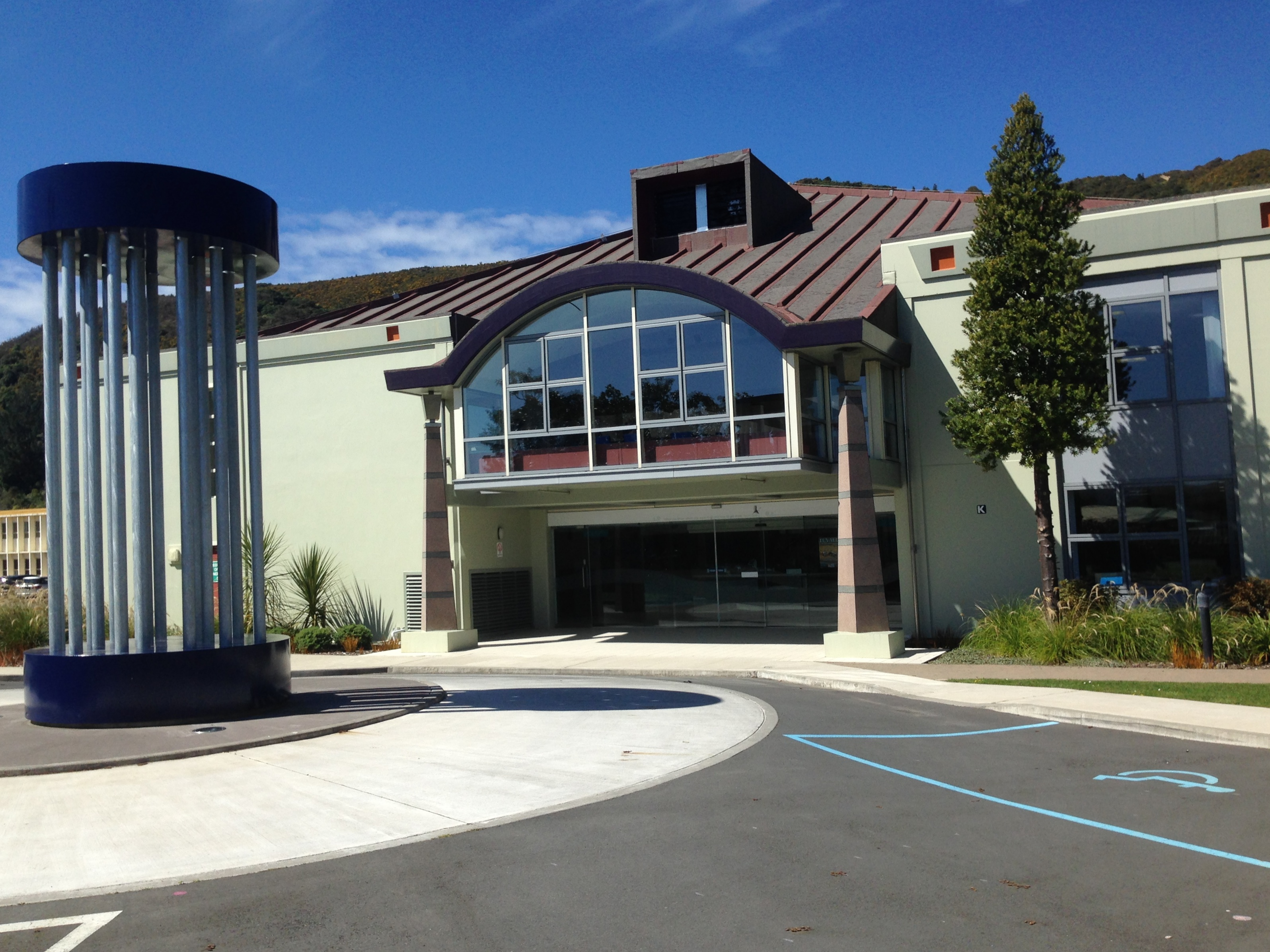
The main entrance to the Open Polytechnic of New Zealand

The city is home to two tertiary institutes: the Wellington Institute of Technology in Petone, and The Open Polytechnic of New Zealand in Waterloo.

== Media ==
The city is served by The Post, The Hutt News and community newspapers.

Local LPFM radio station The Cheese broadcasts in the city, and is licensed with APRA and PPNZ in New Zealand for music broadcasting rights. It began Saturday 1 July 2006 and its original frequency was at 88.4 FM from Wainuiomata. The station can be heard in Lower Hutt on 87.9 MHz FM with simulcasting via their official website. Subscribers to Vodafone TV can hear The Cheese on channel 417. The station broadcasts a mix of music from the 80s, 90s, recent and current hits.

== Flora and fauna ==
Hills to about 350 m (1000 ft) line both sides of the valley within the city limits. The western hills have been populated as residential areas, but the eastern side is protected and clad in native bush and scrub, and the ubiquitous gorse in areas that have been cleared as a result of scrub fires or earlier human activity.

Native birds are common, including the New Zealand pigeon, tūī, grey fantail, silvereye, shining cuckoo (in season), grey warbler and morepork. Introduced species include the common blackbird, song thrush, house sparrow, European goldfinch, common chaffinch, common starling, and Australian magpie.

== Notable people ==
- Ginny Andersen (born 1975), politician
- Chris Bishop (born 1983), politician
- Russell Brown (born 1962), media commentator
- Terence Burns (born 1938), cricketer
- Gordon Onslow Hilbury Burt (1893–1968), photographer
- Tāmati Coffey (born 1979), politician
- Julian Dennison (born 2002), child actor
- Kerry Fox (born 1966), actor
- Brooke Fraser (born 1983), singer and songwriter
- James Hector (1834–1907), geologist, naturalist, and surgeon (died in Lower Hutt)
- Veranoa Hetet (born 1966), Māori weaver and contemporary artist
- Peter Hogg (1939–2020), Canadian lawyer, author and legal scholar best known as the leading authority on Canadian constitutional law
- Hoani Hotene (born 1994–95), Māori comedian
- Mladen Ivančić (born 1955), New Zealand Film Commission official
- Lloyd Jones (born 1955), author
- Shona Laing (born 1955), singer and songwriter
- Ngātata Love (1937-2018), Māori leader and statesman
- Alan MacDiarmid (1927–2007), Nobel laureate
- Megan Mansell (born 1990), New Zealand broadcaster
- Brad McKay (born 1979), Australian medical doctor, sceptic, television personality and author
- Peter Mulgrew (1927–1979), mountaineer, yachtsman and businessman
- Sir Walter Nash (1882–1968), New Zealand Prime Minister (1957–60), MP for Hutt from 1929 to 1968
- Anna Paquin (born 1982), Oscar-winning actress
- Haylee Partridge (born 1981), cricketer
- Erenora Puketapu-Hetet (1941–2006), Māori weaver and author
- Eddie Rayner (born 1952), keyboardist for Split Enz (1974–1984)
- Ben Sears (born 1998), Cricketer for Wellington and New Zealand
- Ross Taylor (born 1984), cricketer
- Tana Umaga (born 1973), former All Blacks captain, former player and current rugby union coach
- Holly Walker (born 1982), politician
- Puti Tipene Watene (1910–1967), rugby league footballer and politician
- Piri Weepu (born 1983), former All Blacks player and current rugby union player
- Nick Willis (born 1983), two-time Olympic medallist

== Sister cities ==
Hutt's sister cities are:

- Minoh, Japan (1995)
- Taizhou, China (2008)
- Tempe, United States (1981)

Since 2000, Hutt also has friendly relations with Xi'an, China.

== Gallery ==
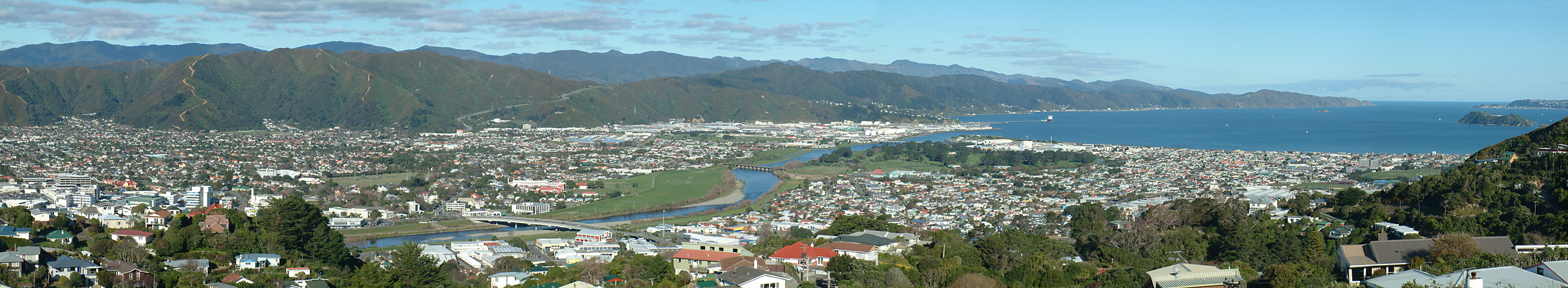
Lower Hutt from Normandale, in the western hills. On the right is the entrance to Wellington Harbour, with Matiu / Somes Island beneath. The Hutt River snakes from the right background to the left mid-ground, entering the harbour between the suburbs of Seaview and Petone. The Wainuiomata Hill Road climbs the hills in the centre background (the track in the middle of the left half of the background is a firebreak, not a road). At the foot of the Wainuiomata Hill Road is the Gracefield industrial area.

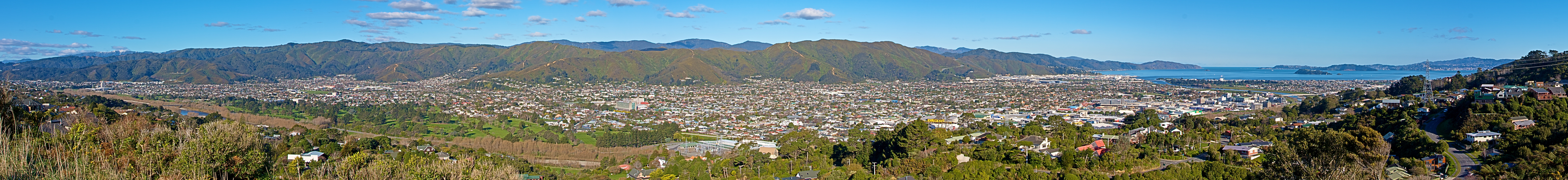
Wider view of the Lower Hutt valley. This view shows Wellington in the distance on the extreme right hand side. Past the Lower Hutt CBD in the centre of the photo, and onto Avalon and Taitā on the left-hand side.

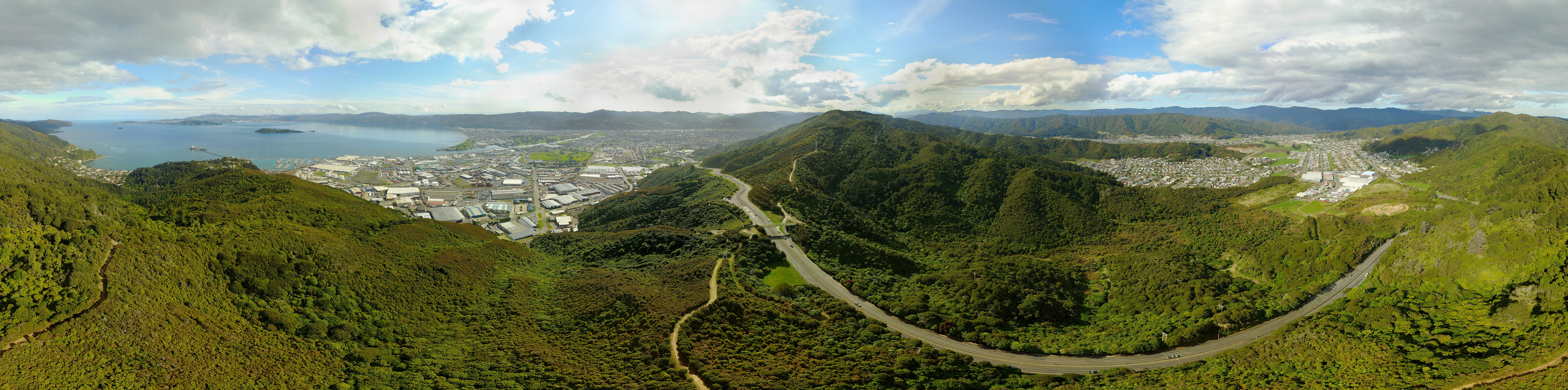
A panorama taken from 400 feet above the Wanuiomata hills. Wellington Harbour can be seen on the far left, with Petone and the Hutt Valley towards the middle of the image. The Wainuiomata Hill road can be seen curling around the bottom right of the image as it snakes into the suburb of Wainuiomata on the right hand side.

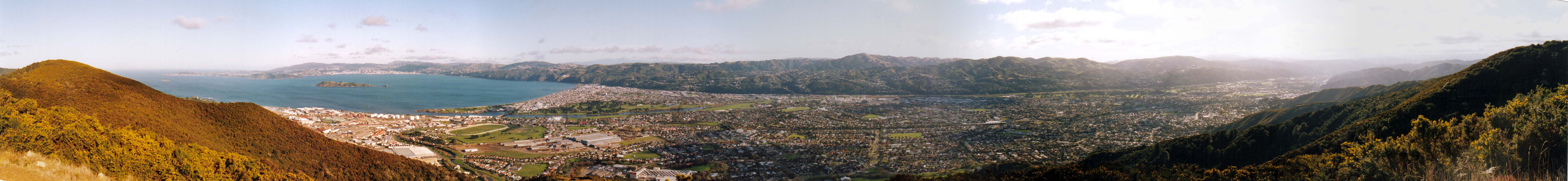
Lower Hutt from the top of the Wainuiomata hills. This viewpoint can be seen in the top panorama by following the ridgeline left from the top of the Wainuiomata Hill Road to the first major firebreak

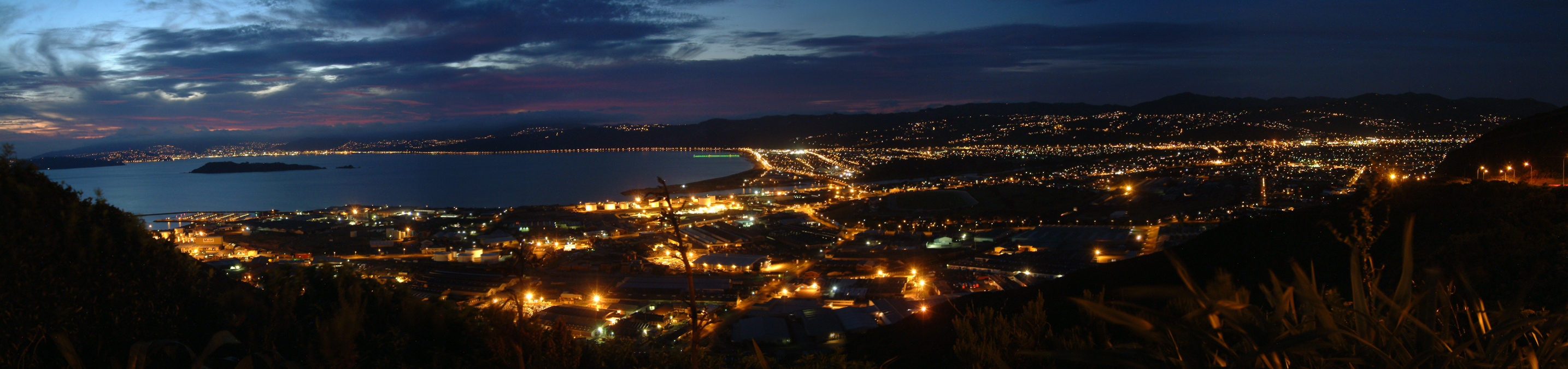
Wellington Harbour and southern Lower Hutt from the top of the Wainuiomata Hill Road (south of the above photo), looking west. Matiu / Somes Island is in the harbour on the left (South), and beyond that the row of lights along State Highway 2, marking the line of the geologic fault, both of which continue up the far side of the valley to the right. The industrial area in the central foreground is Gracefield. In the distance, behind Matiu / Somes Island, are Wellington port and CBD.

== Bibliography ==
- Carey, Alison (2008). Valleys & Bays – Origins of Street Names in Lower Hutt, including Eastbourne, Petone and Wainuiomata. Lower Hutt: Lower Hutt Historical Society. ISBN 978-0-473-13604-8.
