= Alicetown =

Suburb of Lower Hutt, New Zealand

- Suburb
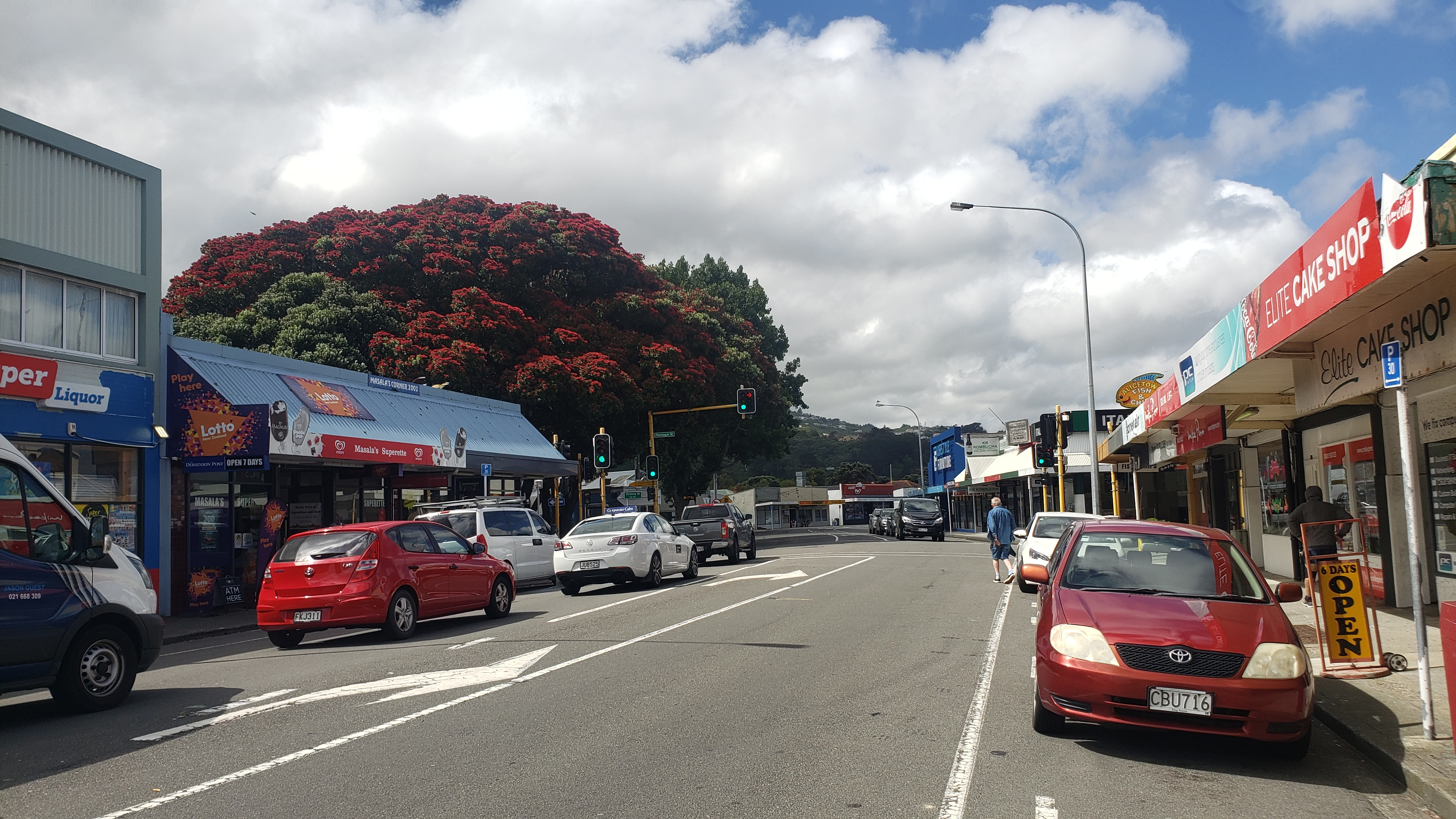
- The main shopping area in Alicetown
- Interactive map of Alicetown
- Coordinates: 41°12′59″S 174°53′27″E
- Country: New Zealand
- City: Lower Hutt City
- Electoral ward: Central
- Established: 1900s

Area
  - Land: 126 ha (310 acres)

Population (June 2025)
  - Total: 2,820
  - Density: 2,240/km^{2} (5,800/sq mi)
- Train stations: Western Hutt railway station, Melling Line. Ava railway station, Hutt Valley Line.

Maungaraki	Normandale	Melling
	Alicetown	Hutt Central
Petone	Ava	Woburn

Alicetown is a central suburb of Lower Hutt located at the bottom of the North Island of New Zealand.

The suburb is situated north of the major suburb of Petone and west of Hutt Central. Its boundaries are the Ewen Bridge that crosses the Hutt River to the east, the Western Hutt Rd/Melling Railway track to the west, Wakefield St/Hutt Railway track to the south and Railway Ave to the north.

== History and culture ==
Aglionby Village, on the western bank of the Hutt River, became one of the first European settlements in Lower Hutt in 1840, upstream from the Britannia settlement. The Aglionby Arms, the valley's first hotel, was built near the corner of what is now Mudie and Montague Streets in 1840 and relocated in 1847. Alicetown began as a farming settlement and was settled from the early 1900s by Petone factory workers.

Alicetown was named for Alice Maud Fitzherbert, the daughter of mayor William Fitzherbert who married Professor George William von Zedlitz in 1905.

Te Tatau o Te Pō Marae was established in Alicetown in 1933. It is a marae (tribal meeting ground) of Taranaki Whānui ki te Upoko o te Ika and Te Āti Awa and includes Te Tatau o Te Pō wharenui (meeting house). Alicetown lost its post office when 580 others closed, on 5 February 1988.

== Demographics ==
Alicetown-Melling statistical area covers 1.26 km^{2} (0.49 sq mi), including Melling. It had an estimated population of 2,820 as of June 2025, with a population density of 2,238 people per km^{2}.

Historical population
Year	Pop.	±% p.a.
2006	2,535	—
2013	2,700	+0.90%
2018	2,793	+0.68%
2023	2,694	−0.72%

Alicetown-Melling had a population of 2,694 in the 2023 New Zealand census, a decrease of 99 people (−3.5%) since the 2018 census, and a decrease of 6 people (−0.2%) since the 2013 census. There were 1,380 males, 1,302 females, and 15 people of other genders in 1,050 dwellings. 5.3% of people identified as LGBTIQ+. The median age was 36.9 years (compared with 38.1 years nationally). There were 498 people (18.5%) aged under 15 years, 513 (19.0%) aged 15 to 29, 1,392 (51.7%) aged 30 to 64, and 294 (10.9%) aged 65 or older.

People could identify as more than one ethnicity. The results were 68.8% European (Pākehā); 15.0% Māori; 8.2% Pasifika; 20.0% Asian; 1.9% Middle Eastern, Latin American and African New Zealanders (MELAA); and 2.6% other, which includes people giving their ethnicity as "New Zealander". English was spoken by 95.7%, Māori by 2.8%, Samoan by 2.9%, and other languages by 18.3%. No language could be spoken by 1.9% (e.g. too young to talk). New Zealand Sign Language was known by 0.6%. The percentage of people born overseas was 29.1, compared with 28.8% nationally.

Religious affiliations were 30.4% Christian, 5.3% Hindu, 0.9% Islam, 0.6% Māori religious beliefs, 1.6% Buddhist, 0.4% New Age, 0.1% Jewish, and 2.1% other religions. People who answered that they had no religion were 53.2%, and 5.7% of people did not answer the census question.

Of those at least 15 years old, 681 (31.0%) people had a bachelor's or higher degree, 1,032 (47.0%) had a post-high school certificate or diploma, and 486 (22.1%) people exclusively held high school qualifications. The median income was $53,700, compared with $41,500 nationally. 432 people (19.7%) earned over $100,000 compared to 12.1% nationally. The employment status of those at least 15 was 1,362 (62.0%) full-time, 261 (11.9%) part-time, and 63 (2.9%) unemployed.

== Education ==
Alicetown has two schools:

- Hutt Central School is a state contributing primary (Year 1–6) school in northern Alicetown, and has 270 students. It was established in 1866, with roots from 1861.
- Te Ara Whanui Kura Kaupapa Māori o ngā Kōhanga Reo o Te Awa Kairangi is a state Māori-immersion full primary (Year 1–8) school in Victoria Street, southern Alicetown, and has 411 students. It started in Seaview in 1995 as Te Ara Whanui Kaupapa Māori, and moved to its current location and adopted its new name in 1996.

Both schools are co-educational. Rolls are as of July 2026.

The nearest state intermediate (Year 7–8) school is Hutt Intermediate School, and the nearest state secondary (Year 9–13) school is Hutt Valley High School, both across the Hutt River in neighbouring Woburn.
