= Harbour View, New Zealand =

Harbour View
- Suburb
- Interactive map of Harbour View
- Coordinates: 41°12′07″S 174°53′56″E
- Country: New Zealand
- Region: Wellington Region
- City: Lower Hutt City
- Local authority: Hutt City Council
- Electoral ward: Western

Area
  - Land: 63 ha (160 acres)

Population (2023 census)
  - Total: 672
  - Density: 1,100/km^{2} (2,800/sq mi)

| | | Tirohanga |
| Normandale | Harbour View |
| | | Melling, Hutt Central |

Harbour View is a suburb of Lower Hutt City situated at the bottom of the North Island of New Zealand. The suburb is located on the western side of the Hutt River and State Highway 2.

== Demographics ==
Harbour View covers 0.63 km^{2} (0.24 sq mi). It is part of the Normandale statistical area.

Historical population
| Year | Pop. | ±% p.a. |
|---|---|---|
| 2006 | 597 | — |
| 2013 | 582 | −0.36% |
| 2018 | 627 | +1.50% |
| 2023 | 672 | +1.40% |

Harbour View had a population of 672 in the 2023 New Zealand census, an increase of 45 people (7.2%) since the 2018 census, and an increase of 90 people (15.5%) since the 2013 census. There were 345 males, 327 females, and 3 people of other genders in 240 dwellings. 4.0% of people identified as LGBTIQ+. There were 135 people (20.1%) aged under 15 years, 120 (17.9%) aged 15 to 29, 321 (47.8%) aged 30 to 64, and 90 (13.4%) aged 65 or older.

People could identify as more than one ethnicity. The results were 76.3% European (Pākehā); 13.8% Māori; 1.3% Pasifika; 18.3% Asian; 2.7% Middle Eastern, Latin American and African New Zealanders (MELAA); and 1.8% other, which includes people giving their ethnicity as "New Zealander". English was spoken by 96.4%, Māori by 1.3%, and other languages by 20.5%. No language could be spoken by 3.1% (e.g. too young to talk). New Zealand Sign Language was known by 0.4%. The percentage of people born overseas was 33.0, compared with 28.8% nationally.

Religious affiliations were 31.7% Christian, 2.7% Hindu, 0.4% Islam, 1.8% Buddhist, 0.4% New Age, and 2.7% other religions. People who answered that they had no religion were 53.1%, and 6.2% of people did not answer the census question.

Of those at least 15 years old, 186 (34.6%) people had a bachelor's or higher degree, 255 (47.5%) had a post-high school certificate or diploma, and 81 (15.1%) people exclusively held high school qualifications. 99 people (18.4%) earned over $100,000 compared to 12.1% nationally. The employment status of those at least 15 was 330 (61.5%) full-time, 75 (14.0%) part-time, and 15 (2.8%) unemployed.
