= Melling, New Zealand =

Suburb of Lower Hutt, New Zealand

Melling
- Suburb
- Interactive map of Melling
- Coordinates: 41°12′32″S 174°53′53″E
- Country: New Zealand
- City: Lower Hutt City
- Electoral ward: Central

Area
  - Land: 21 ha (52 acres)

Population (2023 census)
  - Total: 507
  - Density: 2,400/km^{2} (6,300/sq mi)
- Train stations: Melling railway station

Normandale	Harbour View	Boulcott
Maungaraki	Melling	Hutt Central
	Alicetown

Melling is a suburb of Lower Hutt, to the north of Wellington in the North Island of New Zealand. It is on the west bank of the Hutt River, on State Highway 2, the Wellington-Hutt main road, and directly across the river from the centre of Lower Hutt. It is also the name of the three-lane bridge connecting the Hutt City central business district with State Highway 2, a route subject to extensive congestion at peak times. From the Melling Bridge it is possible to drive straight ahead into the hill suburbs of Harbour View and Tirohanga.

Improved interchanges are planned for the Melling and Kennedy-Good bridges (see RiverLink Project).

== History ==
Melling was named after William Melling, a former Lancashire mentor of Richard Seddon in the foundry where he worked prior to leaving for New Zealand. Seddon and Melling remained in touch, with gifts of New Zealand lamb being sent to Melling at his home in St Helens at Christmas time. The name came about after then-Premier Seddon revisited England and his friend Melling in 1897. Melling had never visited New Zealand, and the local settlers intended to change the name to one of greater significance.

The original Melling railway station opened on 26 May 1908, while the Melling bridge opened in 1909.

== Melling Line ==
The Melling railway station is the terminus of the Melling branch which provides a suburban commuter service to Wellington. This line was originally part of the Hutt Valley Line through to Upper Hutt and the Wairarapa, but became a separate (electrified) branch line on 1 March 1954, when the section north of Melling to Haywards (now Manor Park) was closed and replaced by a new double-tracked line on the eastern side of the Hutt River (the old Melling-Haywards section could not be double-tracked).

== Demographics ==
Melling covers 0.21 km^{2} (0.081 sq mi). It is part of the Alicetown-Melling statistical area.

Historical population
Year	Pop.	±% p.a.
2006	621	—
2013	642	+0.48%
2018	669	+0.83%
2023	507	−5.39%

Melling had a population of 507 in the 2023 New Zealand census, a decrease of 162 people (−24.2%) since the 2018 census, and a decrease of 135 people (−21.0%) since the 2013 census. There were 276 males, 231 females, and 6 people of other genders in 216 dwellings. 5.9% of people identified as LGBTIQ+. There were 84 people (16.6%) aged under 15 years, 114 (22.5%) aged 15 to 29, 249 (49.1%) aged 30 to 64, and 60 (11.8%) aged 65 or older.

People could identify as more than one ethnicity. The results were 52.7% European (Pākehā); 19.5% Māori; 11.2% Pasifika; 32.0% Asian; 2.4% Middle Eastern, Latin American and African New Zealanders (MELAA); and 2.4% other, which includes people giving their ethnicity as "New Zealander". English was spoken by 92.9%, Māori by 3.6%, Samoan by 4.1%, and other languages by 27.2%. No language could be spoken by 3.6% (e.g. too young to talk). New Zealand Sign Language was known by 1.2%. The percentage of people born overseas was 38.5, compared with 28.8% nationally.

Religious affiliations were 30.8% Christian, 14.2% Hindu, 1.8% Islam, 1.2% Māori religious beliefs, 2.4% Buddhist, 0.6% New Age, and 3.6% other religions. People who answered that they had no religion were 41.4%, and 4.1% of people did not answer the census question.

Of those at least 15 years old, 108 (25.5%) people had a bachelor's or higher degree, 186 (44.0%) had a post-high school certificate or diploma, and 108 (25.5%) people exclusively held high school qualifications. 54 people (12.8%) earned over $100,000 compared to 12.1% nationally. The employment status of those at least 15 was 243 (57.4%) full-time, 48 (11.3%) part-time, and 12 (2.8%) unemployed.
