= Belmont, Wellington =

Suburb of Lower Hutt, New Zealand

Belmont
- Suburb
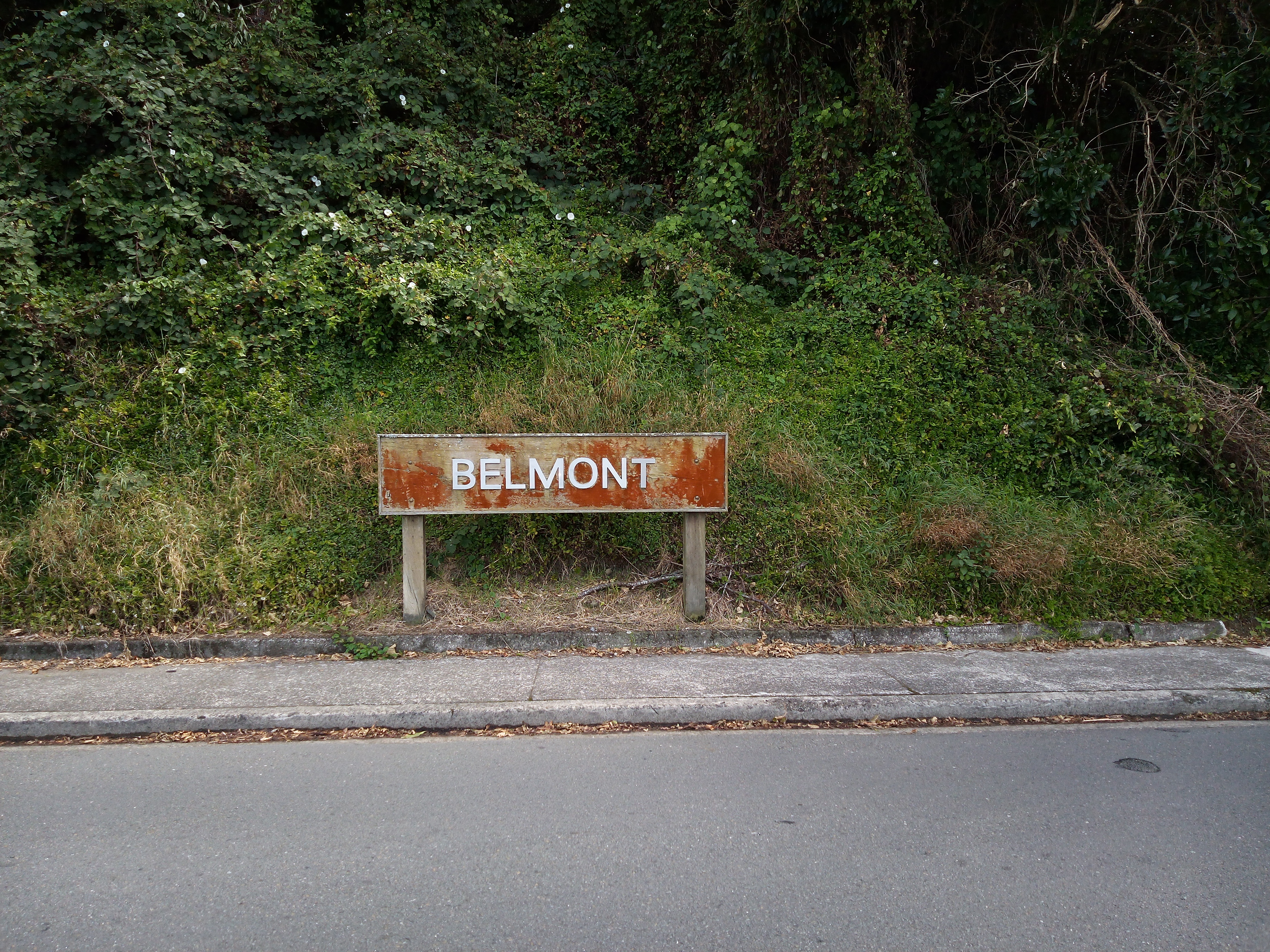
- Belmont suburb sign
- Interactive map of Belmont
- Coordinates: 41°11′27″S 174°55′11″E
- Country: New Zealand
- City: Lower Hutt City
- Local authority: Hutt City Council
- Electoral ward: Western

Area
  - Land: 236 ha (580 acres)

Population (June 2025)
  - Total: 2,780
  - Density: 1,180/km^{2} (3,050/sq mi)

Belmont, a suburb of Lower Hutt, to the north of Wellington in the North Island of New Zealand, lies on the west bank of the Hutt River, on State Highway 2 (SH 2), the Wellington-Hutt main road, and across the river from the centre of Lower Hutt.

It borders the Belmont Regional Park and features much native bush and scenic views. The Belmont Picnic Grounds were a popular venue for outings in the early 1900s. They were operated originally by Mr Kilminster (ca. 1911–1914), then by Mr C. E. Clarke (ca. 1914–1919) and finally by Mrs Eliza Presants, wife of Philip Robert Presants, ca. 1920–1932.

The Institute of Geological and Nuclear Sciences has a kiosk substation in the area. The site has rocky or very stiff soil.

Belmont railway station closed in 1954.

== Demographics ==
=== Belmont ===
Belmont statistical area covers 2.36 km^{2} (0.91 sq mi). It had an estimated population of 2,780 as of June 2025, with a population density of 1,178 people per km^{2}.

Historical population for Belmont
Year	Pop.	±% p.a.
2006	2,346	—
2013	2,478	+0.79%
2018	2,691	+1.66%
2023	2,688	−0.02%

		Kelson
	Belmont	Avalon
Tirohanga	Boulcott	Naenae

Belmont had a population of 2,688 in the 2023 New Zealand census, a decrease of 3 people (−0.1%) since the 2018 census, and an increase of 210 people (8.5%) since the 2013 census. There were 1,335 males, 1,332 females, and 21 people of other genders in 960 dwellings. 4.2% of people identified as LGBTIQ+. The median age was 40.3 years (compared with 38.1 years nationally). There were 504 people (18.8%) aged under 15 years, 399 (14.8%) aged 15 to 29, 1,347 (50.1%) aged 30 to 64, and 435 (16.2%) aged 65 or older.

People could identify as more than one ethnicity. The results were 77.3% European (Pākehā); 11.7% Māori; 4.0% Pasifika; 16.9% Asian; 2.2% Middle Eastern, Latin American and African New Zealanders (MELAA); and 3.3% other, which includes people giving their ethnicity as "New Zealander". English was spoken by 96.7%, Māori by 2.3%, Samoan by 1.1%, and other languages by 20.0%. No language could be spoken by 1.6% (e.g. too young to talk). New Zealand Sign Language was known by 0.4%. The percentage of people born overseas was 29.6, compared with 28.8% nationally.

Religious affiliations were 31.7% Christian, 5.1% Hindu, 0.7% Islam, 0.6% Māori religious beliefs, 0.8% Buddhist, 0.6% New Age, 0.1% Jewish, and 1.6% other religions. People who answered that they had no religion were 53.7%, and 5.4% of people did not answer the census question.

Of those at least 15 years old, 801 (36.7%) people had a bachelor's or higher degree, 1,062 (48.6%) had a post-high school certificate or diploma, and 318 (14.6%) people exclusively held high school qualifications. The median income was $59,700, compared with $41,500 nationally. 516 people (23.6%) earned over $100,000 compared to 12.1% nationally. The employment status of those at least 15 was 1,278 (58.5%) full-time, 303 (13.9%) part-time, and 36 (1.6%) unemployed.

=== Belmont Park ===
Belmont Park statistical area covers 29.46 km^{2} (11.37 sq mi), substantially overlapping with the regional park. It does not include the Lower Hutt suburb of Belmont. It had an estimated population of 350 as of June 2025, with a population density of 12 people per km^{2}.

Historical population for Belmont Park
Year	Pop.	±% p.a.
2006	369	—
2013	336	−1.33%
2018	333	−0.18%
2023	342	+0.53%

Belmont Park had a population of 342 in the 2023 New Zealand census, an increase of 9 people (2.7%) since the 2018 census, and an increase of 6 people (1.8%) since the 2013 census. There were 177 males and 168 females in 132 dwellings. 2.6% of people identified as LGBTIQ+. The median age was 44.4 years (compared with 38.1 years nationally). There were 72 people (21.1%) aged under 15 years, 42 (12.3%) aged 15 to 29, 183 (53.5%) aged 30 to 64, and 48 (14.0%) aged 65 or older.

People could identify as more than one ethnicity. The results were 90.4% European (Pākehā); 5.3% Māori; 3.5% Pasifika; 6.1% Asian; 0.9% Middle Eastern, Latin American and African New Zealanders (MELAA); and 7.0% other, which includes people giving their ethnicity as "New Zealander". English was spoken by 99.1%, Samoan by 0.9%, and other languages by 12.3%. No language could be spoken by 1.8% (e.g. too young to talk). The percentage of people born overseas was 21.1, compared with 28.8% nationally.

Religious affiliations were 26.3% Christian, 3.5% Hindu, 0.9% Māori religious beliefs, and 0.9% other religions. People who answered that they had no religion were 64.0%, and 5.3% of people did not answer the census question.

Of those at least 15 years old, 114 (42.2%) people had a bachelor's or higher degree, 123 (45.6%) had a post-high school certificate or diploma, and 33 (12.2%) people exclusively held high school qualifications. The median income was $59,900, compared with $41,500 nationally. 81 people (30.0%) earned over $100,000 compared to 12.1% nationally. The employment status of those at least 15 was 150 (55.6%) full-time, 45 (16.7%) part-time, and 9 (3.3%) unemployed.

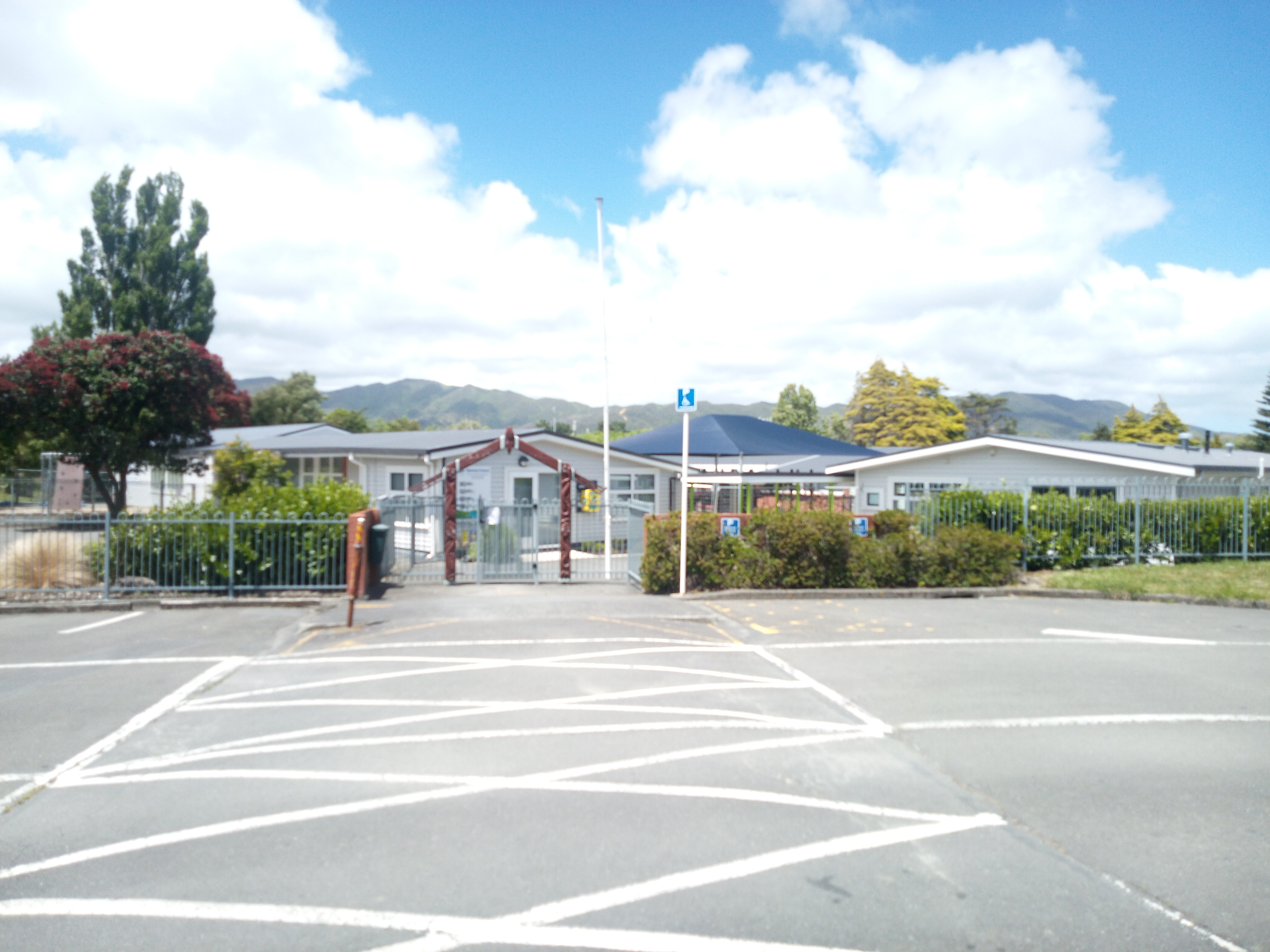
Belmont School (Lower Hutt)

== Education ==
Belmont School is a co-educational state primary school for Year 1 to 6 students, with a roll of 319 students as of October 2025. It opened in 1965.

An earlier school in Belmont, established by 1874, was closed by the Wellington Education Board by 1878.

Raphael House Rudolf Steiner School is located in nearby Tirohanga.
