= Tirohanga =

Suburb of Lower Hutt, New Zealand

- Suburb
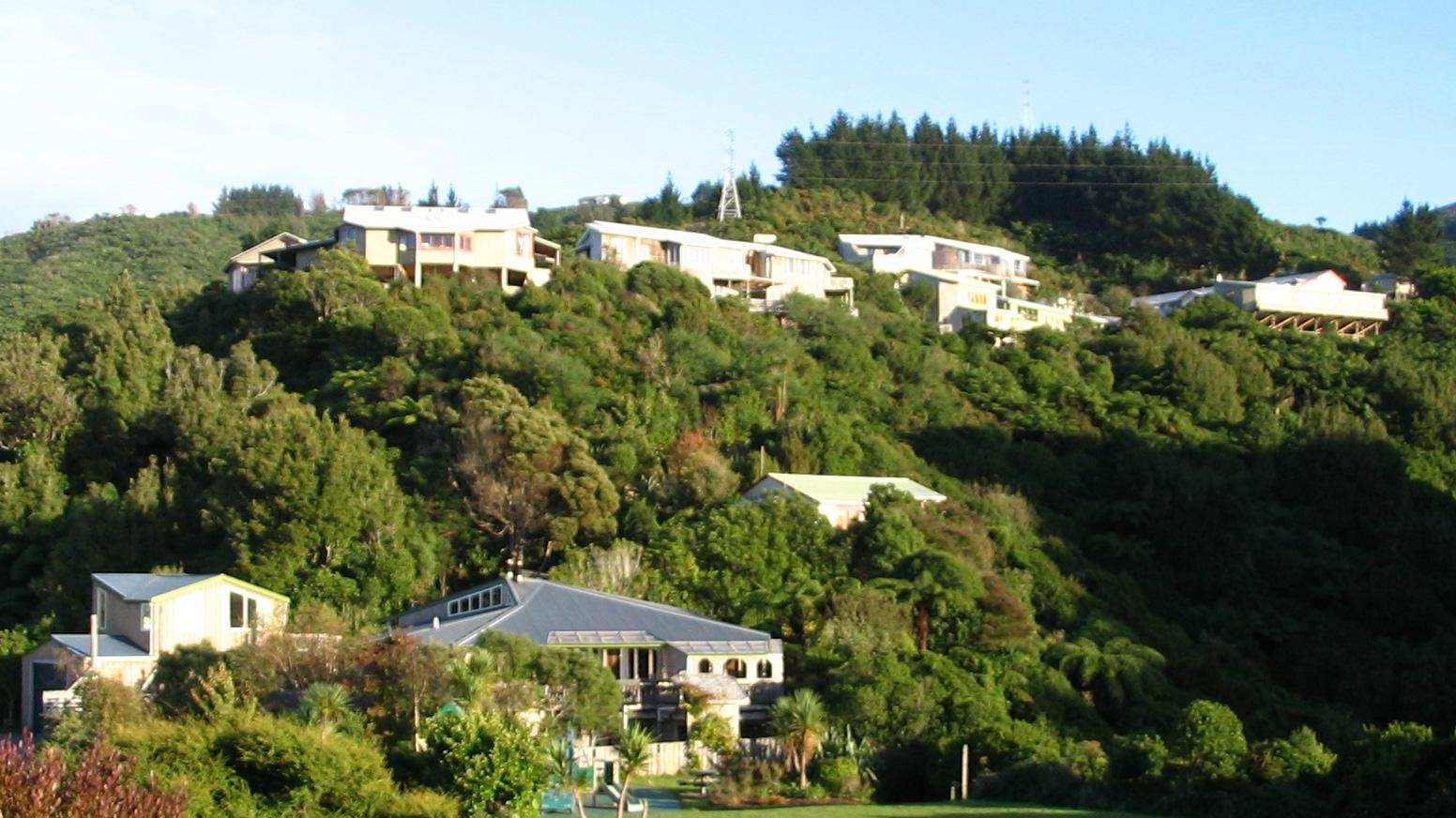
- Raphael House Rudolf Steiner School
- Interactive map of Tirohanga
- Coordinates: 41°11′58″S 174°54′25″E
- Country: New Zealand
- City: Lower Hutt City
- Local authority: Hutt City Council
- Electoral ward: Western

Area
  - Land: 118 ha (290 acres)

Population (June 2025)
  - Total: 1,310
  - Density: 1,110/km^{2} (2,880/sq mi)

		Belmont
	Tirohanga	Boulcott
Harbour View	Melling, Hutt Central

Tirohanga (Te Reo for "distant view") is a suburb of Lower Hutt City situated at the bottom of the North Island of New Zealand. The suburb is located on the western side of the Hutt River and State Highway 2.

== Demographics ==
Tirohanga statistical area covers 1.18 km^{2} (0.46 sq mi). It had an estimated population of 1,310 as of June 2025, with a population density of 1,110 people per km^{2}.

Historical population
Year	Pop.	±% p.a.
2006	1,197	—
2013	1,164	−0.40%
2018	1,287	+2.03%
2023	1,254	−0.52%

Tirohanga had a population of 1,254 in the 2023 New Zealand census, a decrease of 33 people (−2.6%) since the 2018 census, and an increase of 90 people (7.7%) since the 2013 census. There were 621 males, 624 females, and 9 people of other genders in 399 dwellings. 3.8% of people identified as LGBTIQ+. The median age was 40.5 years (compared with 38.1 years nationally). There were 231 people (18.4%) aged under 15 years, 231 (18.4%) aged 15 to 29, 609 (48.6%) aged 30 to 64, and 183 (14.6%) aged 65 or older.

People could identify as more than one ethnicity. The results were 72.5% European (Pākehā); 7.2% Māori; 3.3% Pasifika; 23.9% Asian; 1.2% Middle Eastern, Latin American and African New Zealanders (MELAA); and 3.6% other, which includes people giving their ethnicity as "New Zealander". English was spoken by 95.5%, Māori by 1.7%, Samoan by 0.5%, and other languages by 23.0%. No language could be spoken by 1.9% (e.g. too young to talk). New Zealand Sign Language was known by 1.0%. The percentage of people born overseas was 32.5, compared with 28.8% nationally.

Religious affiliations were 26.1% Christian, 6.0% Hindu, 1.0% Islam, 0.5% Māori religious beliefs, 2.4% Buddhist, 0.7% New Age, and 2.6% other religions. People who answered that they had no religion were 54.8%, and 6.2% of people did not answer the census question.

Of those at least 15 years old, 393 (38.4%) people had a bachelor's or higher degree, 474 (46.3%) had a post-high school certificate or diploma, and 159 (15.5%) people exclusively held high school qualifications. The median income was $58,400, compared with $41,500 nationally. 246 people (24.0%) earned over $100,000 compared to 12.1% nationally. The employment status of those at least 15 was 618 (60.4%) full-time, 138 (13.5%) part-time, and 18 (1.8%) unemployed.

== Education ==
Raphael House Rudolf Steiner School is a co-educational state-integrated school for Year 1 to 13 students, with a roll of 273 as of October 2025. It is a Waldorf Steiner school founded in 1979.
