= Udy =

Udy or UDY may refer to:

== People ==
- Dan Udy (1874–1935), New Zealand rugby union player.
- Giles Udy (born 1956), English writer and historian of the Soviet Gulag system.
- Gloster Udy (1918–2003), Australian Uniting Church minister and author.
- Hart Udy (1857–1934), New Zealand rugby union player.
- James Udy (1920–2003), Australian Uniting Church minister.
- Marvin J. Udy (1892-1959), American engineer.

== Other ==
- Udy (river), a river in Belgorod Oblast (Russia) and Kharkiv Oblast (Ukraine).
- Udy (village), a village in Kharkiv Oblast, Ukraine.
