= Hutt Valley District Health Board =

District health board in New Zealand

- Location of the Hutt Valley DHB (green) in New Zealand
- Formation: 1 January 2001; 25 years ago
- Founder: New Zealand Government
- Dissolved: 1 July 2022; 4 years ago
- Legal status: Active
- Purpose: DHB
- Services: Health and disability services
- Parent organization: Ministry of Health
- Website: www.huttvalleydhb.org.nz

The Hutt Valley District Health Board (Hutt Valley DHB) was a district health board that provided healthcare to the cities of Lower Hutt and Upper Hutt in New Zealand. In July 2022, the Hutt Valley DHB was merged into the national health service Te Whatu Ora (Health New Zealand).

== History ==
The Hutt Valley District Health Board, like most other district health boards, came into effect on 1 January 2001 established by the New Zealand Public Health and Disability Act 2000.

On 1 July 2022, the Hutt Valley DHB and the other district health boards were disestablished, with Te Whatu Ora (Health New Zealand) assuming their former functions and operations including hospitals and health services. The Hutt Valley DHB along with the former Capital & Coast District Health Board were brought under Te Whatu Ora's Central division.

== Geographic area ==
The area covered by the Hutt Valley District Health Board is defined in Schedule 1 of the New Zealand Public Health and Disability Act 2000 and based on territorial authority and ward boundaries as constituted as at 1 January 2001. The area can be adjusted through an Order in Council.

== Facilities ==
Hutt Hospital, in the Lower Hutt suburb of Boulcott, is the DHB's main hospital.

== Governance ==
The initial board was fully appointed. Since the 2001 local elections, the board has been partially elected (seven members) and in addition, up to four members get appointed by the Minister of Health. The minister also appoints the chairperson and deputy-chair from the pool of eleven board members.

== Demographics ==
Historical population
Year	Pop.	±% p.a.
2006	136,101	—
2013	138,378	+0.24%
2018	148,509	+1.42%

Hutt Valley DHB served a population of 148,509 at the 2018 New Zealand census, an increase of 10,131 people (7.3%) since the 2013 census, and an increase of 12,408 people (9.1%) since the 2006 census. There were 53,034 households. There were 73,512 males and 75,000 females, giving a sex ratio of 0.98 males per female. The median age was 37.5 years (compared with 37.4 years nationally), with 29,694 people (20.0%) aged under 15 years, 28,845 (19.4%) aged 15 to 29, 69,141 (46.6%) aged 30 to 64, and 20,832 (14.0%) aged 65 or older.

Ethnicities were 71.6% European/Pākehā, 17.6% Māori, 9.8% Pacific peoples, 13.2% Asian, and 2.9% other ethnicities. People may identify with more than one ethnicity.

The percentage of people born overseas was 24.2, compared with 27.1% nationally.

Although some people objected to giving their religion, 47.0% had no religion, 38.3% were Christian, 3.2% were Hindu, 0.9% were Muslim, 1.1% were Buddhist and 3.4% had other religions.

Of those at least 15 years old, 27,594 (23.2%) people had a bachelor or higher degree, and 20,310 (17.1%) people had no formal qualifications. The median income was $34,900, compared with $31,800 nationally. 23,346 people (19.6%) earned over $70,000 compared to 17.2% nationally. The employment status of those at least 15 was that 62,145 (52.3%) people were employed full-time, 15,891 (13.4%) were part-time, and 5,421 (4.6%) were unemployed.

== Hospitals ==
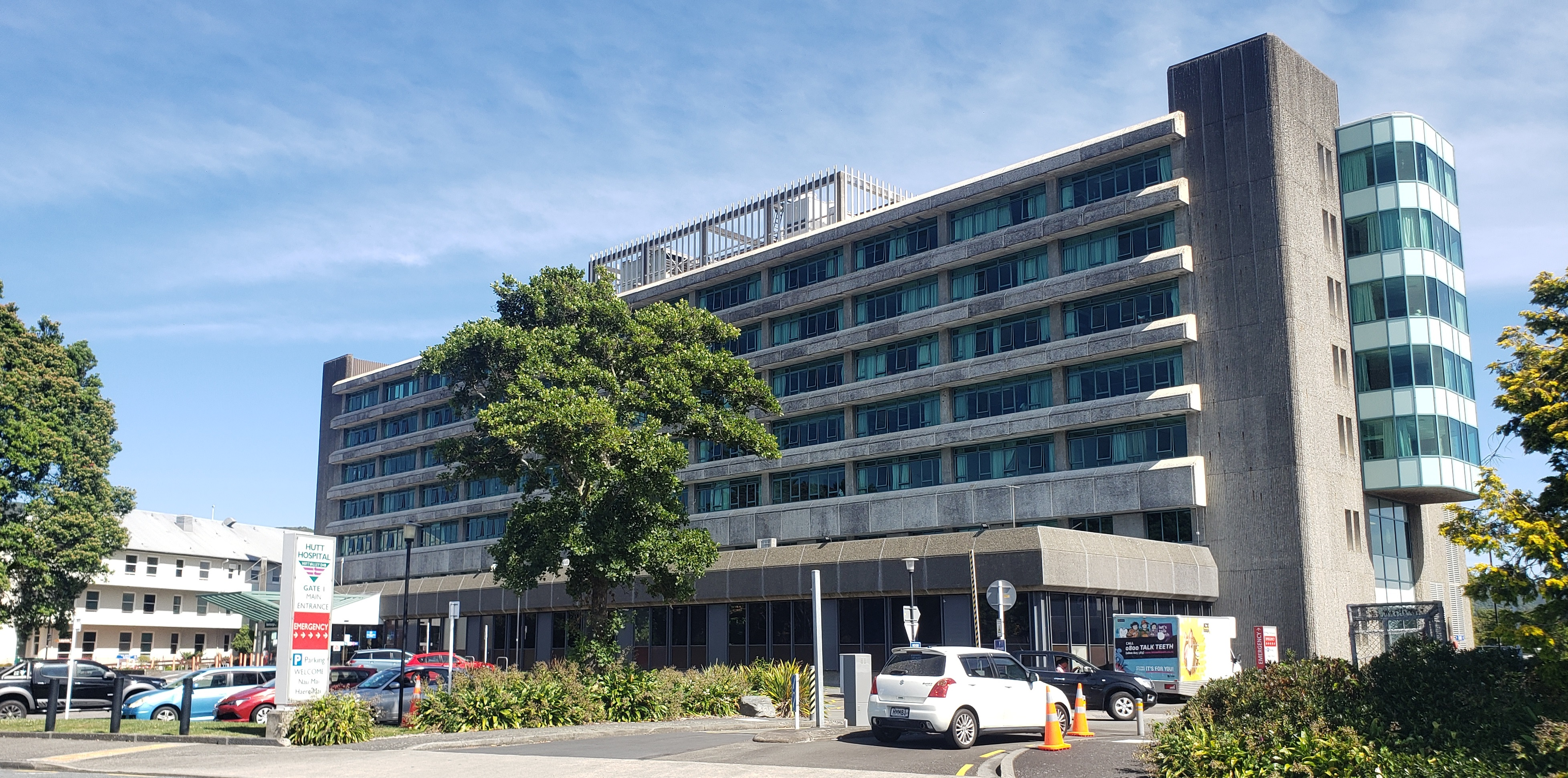
Hutt Hospital is the single public hospital within the Hutt Valley DHB.

=== Public hospital ===
- Hutt Hospital (41.2045168°S 174.9226535°E) in Boulcott has 322 beds and provides maternity, geriatric, surgical, mental health, medical, children's health, psychogeriatric services.

=== Private hospitals ===
- Boulcott Hospital (41.2035978°S 174.9243913°E) in Boulcott has 38 beds and provides surgical services.
- Te Awakairangi Birthing Centre (41.2040427°S 174.9096135°E) in Hutt Central has 12 beds and provides maternity services.
- Te Omanga Hospice (41.203091°S 174.8827532°E) in Woburn has 10 beds and provides medical services.
