= Boulcott =

Suburb of Lower Hutt, New Zealand

- Suburb
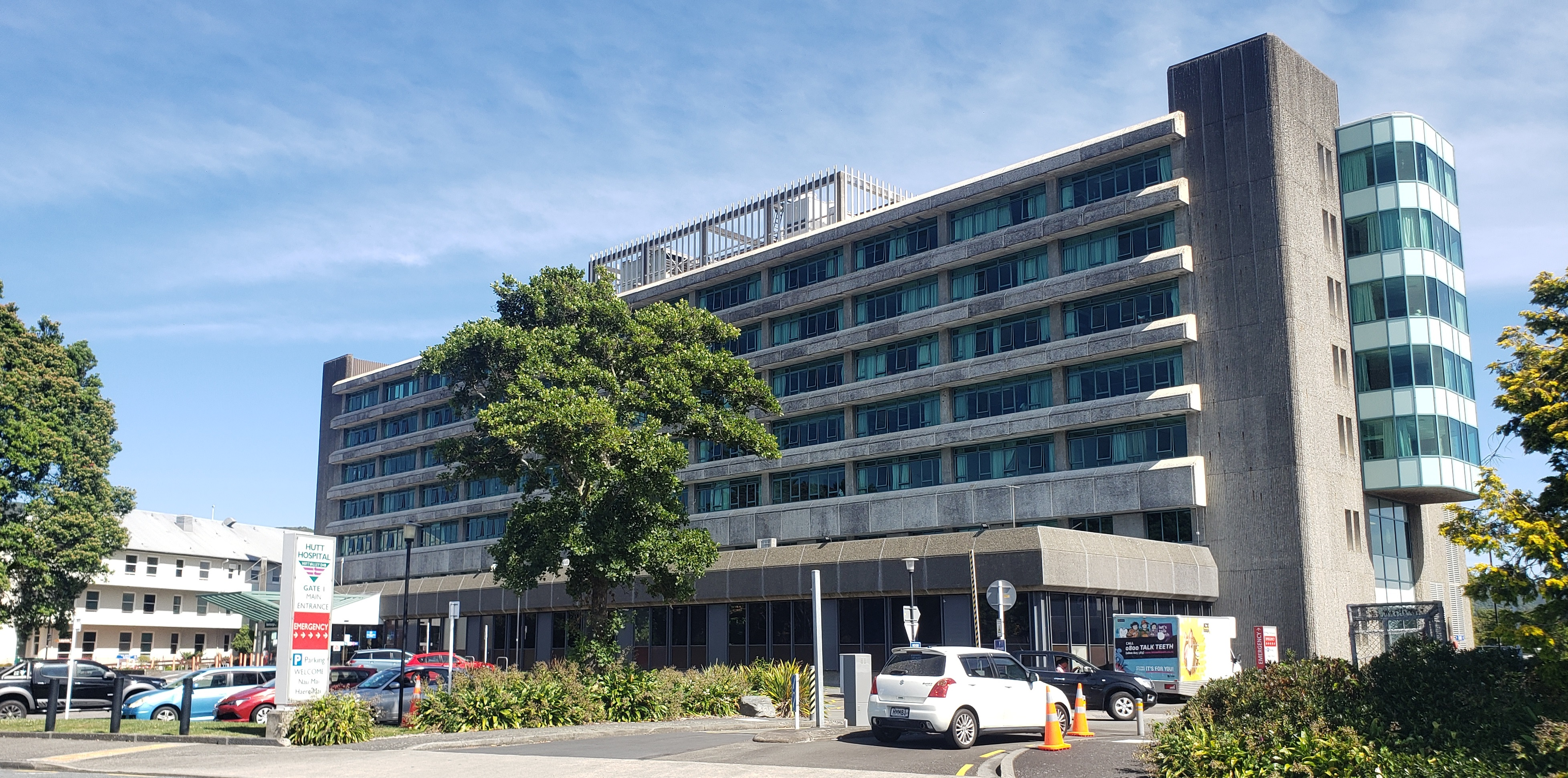
- Hutt Hospital is the most recognisable building in Boulcott.
- Interactive map of Boulcott
- Coordinates: 41.203616°S 174.921551°E
- Country: New Zealand
- City: Lower Hutt City
- Local authority: Hutt City Council
- Electoral ward: Central

Area
  - Land: 158 ha (390 acres)

Population (June 2025)
  - Total: 2,850
  - Density: 1,800/km^{2} (4,670/sq mi)
- Hospitals: Hutt Hospital, Boulcott Hospital

Belmont		Avalon
Tirohanga	Boulcott	Epuni
	Lower Hutt CBD

Boulcott is a central suburb of Lower Hutt, in the Wellington Region of New Zealand. The suburb lies about a kilometre north-east of the Lower Hutt CBD.

Boulcott takes its name from Almon Boulcott (1815–1880), who farmed in the area in the 1840s. His father, John Ellerker Boulcott (1784–1855), was a director of the New Zealand Company. Armed conflict took place in the area at Boulcott's Farm in 1846 during the Hutt Valley Campaign.

Two Lower Hutt hospitals; Hutt Hospital and Boulcott Hospital, lie in Boulcott.

== Demographics ==
Boulcott statistical area covers 1.58 km^{2} (0.61 sq mi). It had an estimated population of 2,850 as of June 2025, with a population density of 1,804 people per km^{2}.

Historical population
Year	Pop.	±% p.a.
2006	2,451	—
2013	2,487	+0.21%
2018	2,613	+0.99%
2023	2,697	+0.63%

Boulcott had a population of 2,697 in the 2023 New Zealand census, an increase of 84 people (3.2%) since the 2018 census, and an increase of 210 people (8.4%) since the 2013 census. There were 1,278 males, 1,413 females, and 9 people of other genders in 987 dwellings. 2.7% of people identified as LGBTIQ+. The median age was 41.1 years (compared with 38.1 years nationally). There were 489 people (18.1%) aged under 15 years, 402 (14.9%) aged 15 to 29, 1,287 (47.7%) aged 30 to 64, and 522 (19.4%) aged 65 or older.

People could identify as more than one ethnicity. The results were 65.0% European (Pākehā); 12.2% Māori; 6.9% Pasifika; 25.1% Asian; 2.1% Middle Eastern, Latin American and African New Zealanders (MELAA); and 2.7% other, which includes people giving their ethnicity as "New Zealander". English was spoken by 94.0%, Māori by 2.8%, Samoan by 1.8%, and other languages by 21.8%. No language could be spoken by 2.0% (e.g. too young to talk). New Zealand Sign Language was known by 0.4%. The percentage of people born overseas was 29.9, compared with 28.8% nationally.

Religious affiliations were 36.7% Christian, 6.2% Hindu, 1.6% Islam, 0.3% Māori religious beliefs, 1.8% Buddhist, 0.2% New Age, 0.1% Jewish, and 1.2% other religions. People who answered that they had no religion were 46.4%, and 5.6% of people did not answer the census question.

Of those at least 15 years old, 723 (32.7%) people had a bachelor's or higher degree, 1,005 (45.5%) had a post-high school certificate or diploma, and 480 (21.7%) people exclusively held high school qualifications. The median income was $49,100, compared with $41,500 nationally. 465 people (21.1%) earned over $100,000 compared to 12.1% nationally. The employment status of those at least 15 was 1,173 (53.1%) full-time, 258 (11.7%) part-time, and 45 (2.0%) unemployed.

== Education ==
Boulcott has two schools:

- Boulcott School, a state contributing primary (Year 1–6) school. It has 336 students as of July 2026. It opened in 1928.
- St Oran's College, a state-integrated Presbyterian girls' Year 7–13 secondary school. It has 503 students as of July 2026. It opened in 1958, and became state-integrated in 1991.

The nearest state intermediate (Year 7 and 8) schools are Naenae Intermediate School in Avalon to the north-east or Hutt Intermediate School in Woburn to the south. The nearest state secondary (Year 9–13) school is Naenae College in Avalon.
