= Hutt Central =

Central business district of Lower Hutt, New Zealand

- Suburb
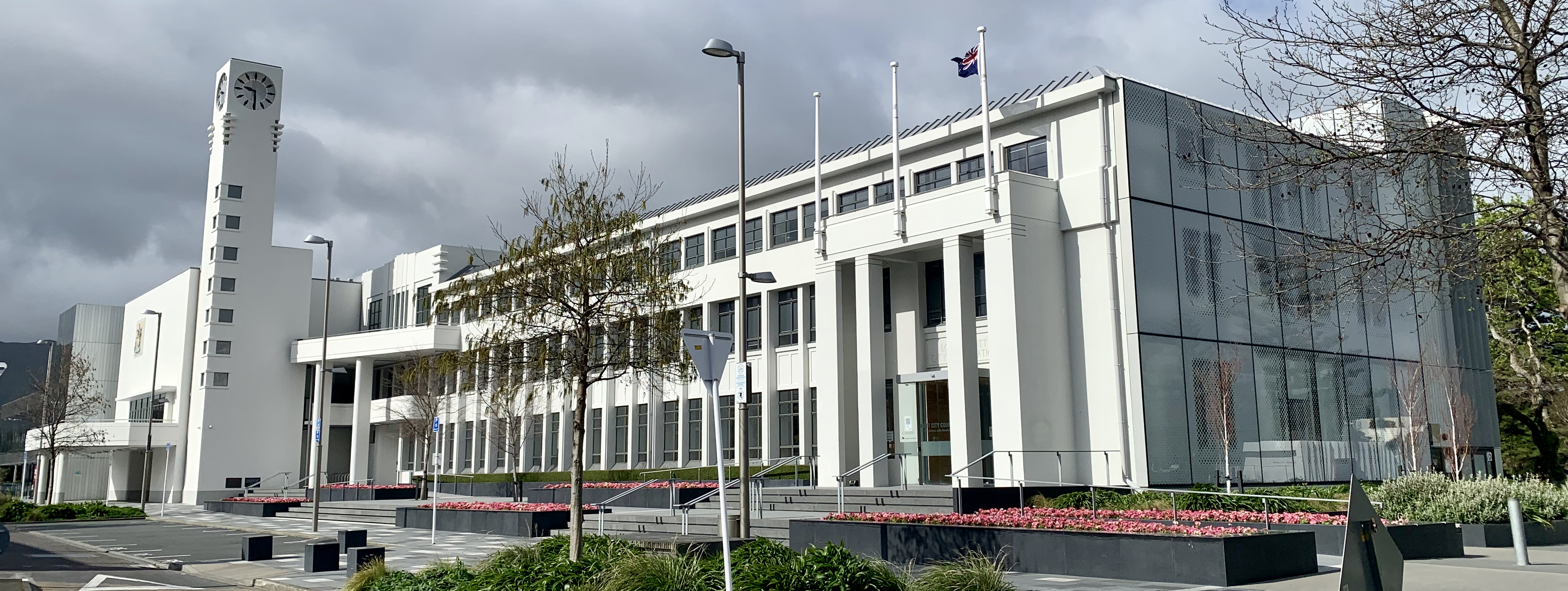
- The Lower Hutt town hall and council building is in Hutt Central.
- Interactive map of Hutt Central
- Coordinates: 41.208764°S 174.905975°E
- Country: New Zealand
- City: Lower Hutt City
- Local authority: Hutt City Council
- Electoral ward: Central

Area
  - Land: 236 ha (580 acres)

Population (June 2025)
  - Total: 4,470
  - Density: 1,890/km^{2} (4,910/sq mi)

Harbour View	Boulcott	Epuni
Melling	Hutt Central	Fairfield
Alicetown	Woburn	Waterloo

Hutt Central, a suburb of the city of Lower Hutt in New Zealand, forms part of the urban area of greater Wellington. It includes the Lower Hutt CBD.

It includes Dowse Art Museum, Lower Hutt War Memorial Library and Lower Hutt Central Fire Station.

== Demographics ==
Hutt Central, comprising the statistical areas of Hutt Central North and Hutt Central South, covers 2.36 km^{2} (0.91 sq mi). It had an estimated population of 4,470 as of June 2025, with a population density of 1,894 people per km^{2}.

Historical population
Year	Pop.	±% p.a.
2006	3,738	—
2013	3,954	+0.81%
2018	4,176	+1.10%
2023	4,185	+0.04%

Hutt Central North had a population of 4,185 in the 2023 New Zealand census, an increase of 9 people (0.2%) since the 2018 census, and an increase of 231 people (5.8%) since the 2013 census. There were 2,001 males, 2,160 females, and 21 people of other genders in 1,662 dwellings. 3.6% of people identified as LGBTIQ+. There were 624 people (14.9%) aged under 15 years, 765 (18.3%) aged 15 to 29, 1,824 (43.6%) aged 30 to 64, and 966 (23.1%) aged 65 or older.

People could identify as more than one ethnicity. The results were 64.5% European (Pākehā); 9.3% Māori; 4.5% Pasifika; 29.1% Asian; 1.4% Middle Eastern, Latin American and African New Zealanders (MELAA); and 2.2% other, which includes people giving their ethnicity as "New Zealander". English was spoken by 94.8%, Māori by 2.2%, Samoan by 1.2%, and other languages by 24.9%. No language could be spoken by 1.6% (e.g. too young to talk). New Zealand Sign Language was known by 0.4%. The percentage of people born overseas was 32.8, compared with 28.8% nationally.

Religious affiliations were 33.4% Christian, 6.3% Hindu, 1.3% Islam, 0.2% Māori religious beliefs, 1.9% Buddhist, 0.4% New Age, 0.1% Jewish, and 1.5% other religions. People who answered that they had no religion were 49.0%, and 5.9% of people did not answer the census question.

Of those at least 15 years old, 1,320 (37.1%) people had a bachelor's or higher degree, 1,569 (44.1%) had a post-high school certificate or diploma, and 672 (18.9%) people exclusively held high school qualifications. 708 people (19.9%) earned over $100,000 compared to 12.1% nationally. The employment status of those at least 15 was 1,803 (50.6%) full-time, 447 (12.6%) part-time, and 81 (2.3%) unemployed.

Individual statistical areas
Name	Area (km^{2})	Population	Density (per km^{2})	Dwellings	Median age	Median income
Hutt Central North	1.07	1,074	1,004	486	36.2 years	$52,100
Hutt Central South	1.29	3,111	2,412	1,176	47.8 years	$48,100
New Zealand					38.1 years	$41,500

== Education ==
=== Public schools ===
Eastern Hutt School is a co-educational state primary school for Year 1 to 6 students, with a roll of 620 as of October 2025. It opened in 1910 as a side school for Hutt District High School (now Hutt Central School) and became a separate school in 1915.

Intermediate education is available in nearby Hutt Intermediate School in Woburn.

Hutt Valley High School is a co-educational state secondary school for Year 9 to 13 students, with a roll of 1,903. It was founded in 1926.

=== Independent schools ===
Sts Peter and Paul School is a co-educational state-integrated Catholic primary school for Year 1 to 8 students, with a roll of 459 as of October 2025. It opened in 1853, and moved to its current site in 1929.

Chilton St James School is a private girls' school for Year 1 to 13 students, with a roll of 245. It was founded in 1918.

Sacred Heart College is a girls' state-integrated Catholic school for Year 9 to 13 students, with a roll of 821. It was founded in 1912.

St Bernard's College is a boys' state-integrated Catholic school for Year 7 to 13 students, with a roll of 660. It was founded in 1946.
