= Waiwhetū Stream =

River in New Zealand

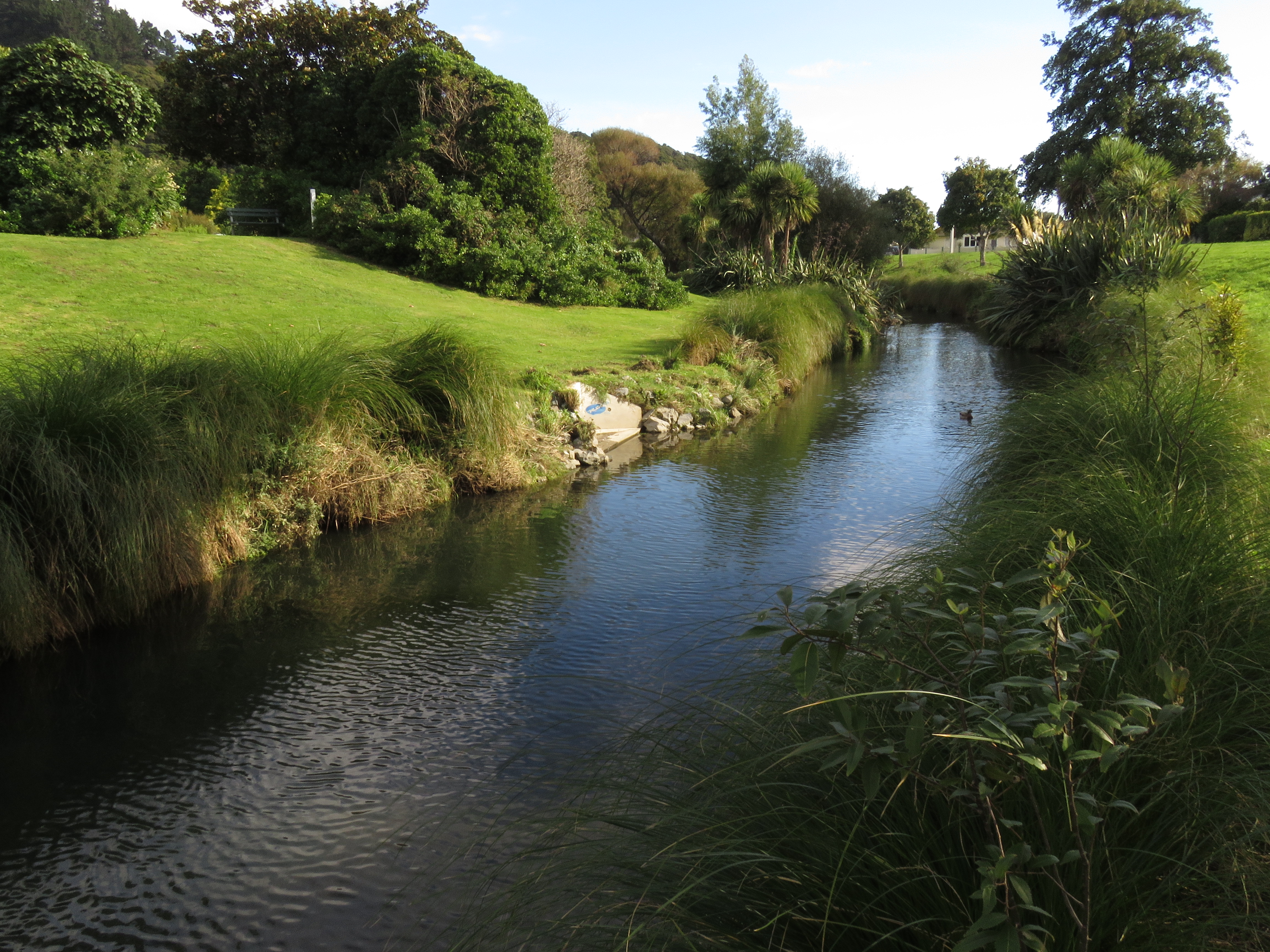
- Waiwhetū Stream between the suburbs of Naenae and Waterloo
- Route of the Waiwhetū Stream
- Native name: Waiwhetū (Māori)

Location
- Country: New Zealand
- Island: North Island
- Region: Wellington
- District: Lower Hutt

Physical characteristics
- Source: Hutt Valley
  - coordinates: 41.20811°S 174.97431°E
- Mouth: Te Awa Kairangi / Hutt River
  - coordinates: 41°14′15″S 174°54′04″E
  - elevation: 0 m (0 ft)
- Length: 9 km (5.6 mi)
- Basin size: 18 km^{2} (6.9 sq mi)

Basin features
- Progression: Waiwhetū Stream → Te Awa Kairangi / Hutt River → Wellington Harbour → Cook Strait → Pacific Ocean
- Cities: Lower Hutt (Naenae, Fairfield, Waterloo, Waiwhetū, Gracefield, Moera)
- Tributaries
  - right: Awamutu Stream
- Bridges: Seddon Street Bridge, Waddington Drive Bridge, Hamerton Street Bridge, Tilbury Street Bridge, footbridge between Riverside Drive and Wyndrum Avenue, Rossiter Avenue Bridge, Cleary Street Bridge, Tw Whiti Park footbridges, Whites Lane East Bridge, Waiwhetu Stream Bridge (Wainui Road), Bell Road South Bridge, Gracefield Branch railway bridge, Hutt Park Road Bridge, Seaview Road Bridge, Port Road Bridge

The Waiwhetū Stream is a small watercourse in Lower Hutt, in the North Island of New Zealand. The stream drains the eastern side of the Hutt Valley, and enters Wellington Harbour at the Hutt River estuary. Development and urbanisation of the Hutt Valley since the arrival of settlers led to increasing pollution and degradation of the stream environment. The stream was diverted into concrete culverts in some sections in an attempt to reduce flooding.

Industrial development in the area around the lower reaches of the stream led to that section becoming an industrial sewer. Discharges of industrial waste into the lower reaches ceased in the 1980s when trade wastes were connected to piped sewer mains. However, the stream remained highly polluted with toxic sediments. In 2010, the stream was described as one of the most polluted waterways in New Zealand. Pressure from the community beginning around 2003 helped to trigger a major project to clean up the lower reaches. This project was declared complete in June 2010, after the removal of 56,000 tonnes of toxic waste.

In 2010–2011, a community group was formed to lead restoration of the upper reaches of the stream. Over a period of 10 years, volunteers cleared invasive aquatic weeds and rubbish from six kilometres (3.7 mi) of the stream bed and established around 34,000 locally sourced native plants on the banks of the stream.

== Toponymy ==
Waiwhetū means "star reflecting water" in Māori, and is the name given to the original pā site in the area, the local marae, the suburb, and the stream. Waiwhetū Stream is an official name recognised by the New Zealand Geographic Board.

== Geography ==
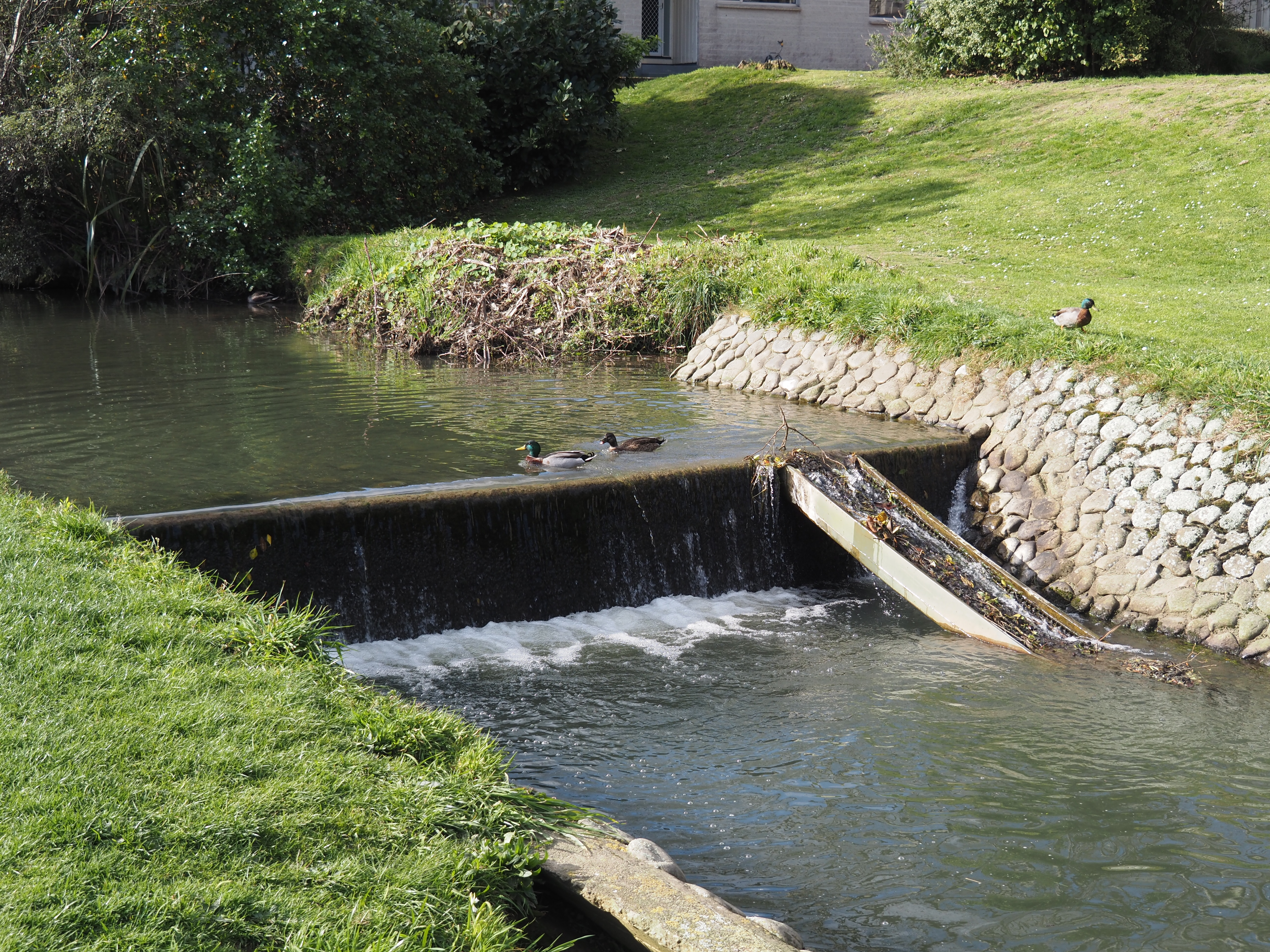
Weir and fish ladder on Waiwhetū Stream

The stream has its headwaters in the Eastern Hutt hills, above the suburbs of Wingate and Naenae in Lower Hutt. It has a catchment area of around 18 square kilometres (6.9 sq mi). The stream is around nine kilometres (5.6 mi) in length and passes through the eastern suburbs of Fairfield, Waterloo, and Waiwhetū, and the industrial areas of Seaview and Gracefield before entering the estuary of the Hutt River Te Awa Kairangi as it reaches Wellington Harbour.

== History ==
The stream was traditionally a food source for local Māori, providing whitebait, eels and watercress.

Prior to the 1855 Wairarapa earthquake, vessels large enough for coastal trade could navigate the lower reaches of the Waiwhetū stream, and there were several shipyards. One shipyard was located close to where Whites Line East crosses the stream. However, the earthquake raised the level of the valley floor by 1.5 metres (4 ft 11 in), and the stream was no longer navigable.

=== Flooding ===
Early plans by European settlers migrating to New Zealand included the establishment of a new town, to be called Britannia, that would be located in the Hutt Valley bounded by the hills to the west, and the Waiwhetū Stream to the east, with Hutt River running through the middle. However, these plans were changed within a short time, after a large flood in the Hutt River persuaded the settlers that the town should be located at the opposite side of the harbour. This new town was to be called Wellington.

From the earliest times of colonial settlement, the Waiwhetū Stream was the source of occasional floods that caused stock losses and damage to property. Heavy rain in July 1912 and August 1928 led to the Waiwhetū Stream overflowing its banks and flooding the nearby Hutt Park and surrounding area. Residents living close to the stream were required to evacuate their homes on 15 November 2016 because of high flood levels.

=== Flock mill ===
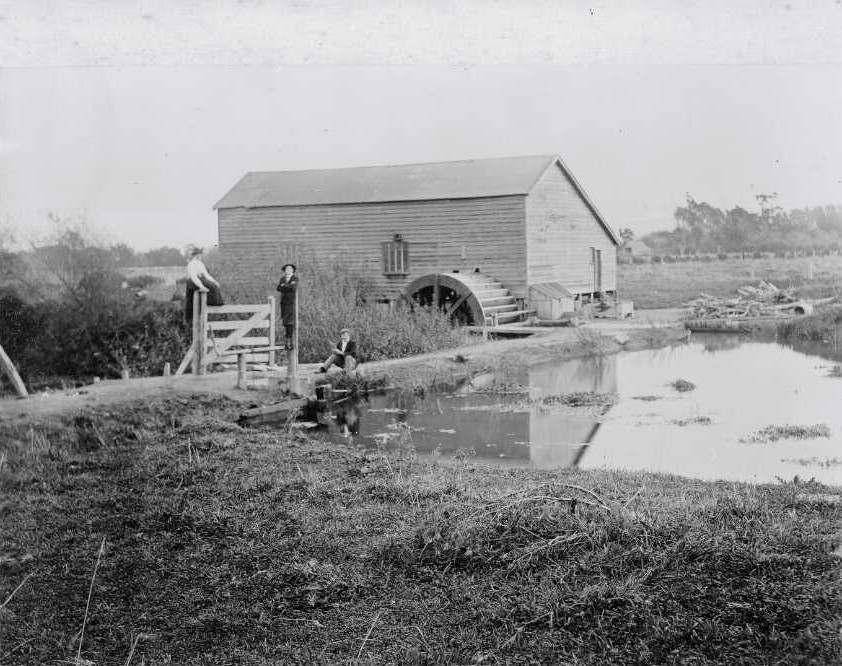
The flock mill with water wheel prior to the 1901 fire

A flock mill was established in 1898 in Fairfield, adjacent to the Waiwhetū Stream at the intersection of what is now Rumgay Street and Riverside Drive. It used a weir in the stream and a breastshot water wheel as a source of mechanical power. The flock mill operated for around 50 years, but was the subject of litigation in 1909–1910 that was heard in the Supreme Court over the effects of the flooding caused by the construction of the weir in the stream.

=== Fish ===
A particularly large eel weighing almost 11 kilograms (25 lb) was caught in the stream in 1876. The Acclimatisation Society liberated perch into the Waiwhetū Stream in 1913. An unusual catch was made in 1924 with the capture of a lamprey in the stream.

=== Public perception ===
In 1906, a newspaper featured photographs of picturesque scenes on the upper reaches of the Waiwhetū Stream. In a property advertisement in 1928, the Waiwhetū Stream was described as "the Avon of Wellington". In 1937, the committee managing Hutt Park considered a proposal to build a weir in the adjacent Waiwhetū Stream so that it could be used for bathing, even during low tide.

=== Pollution ===
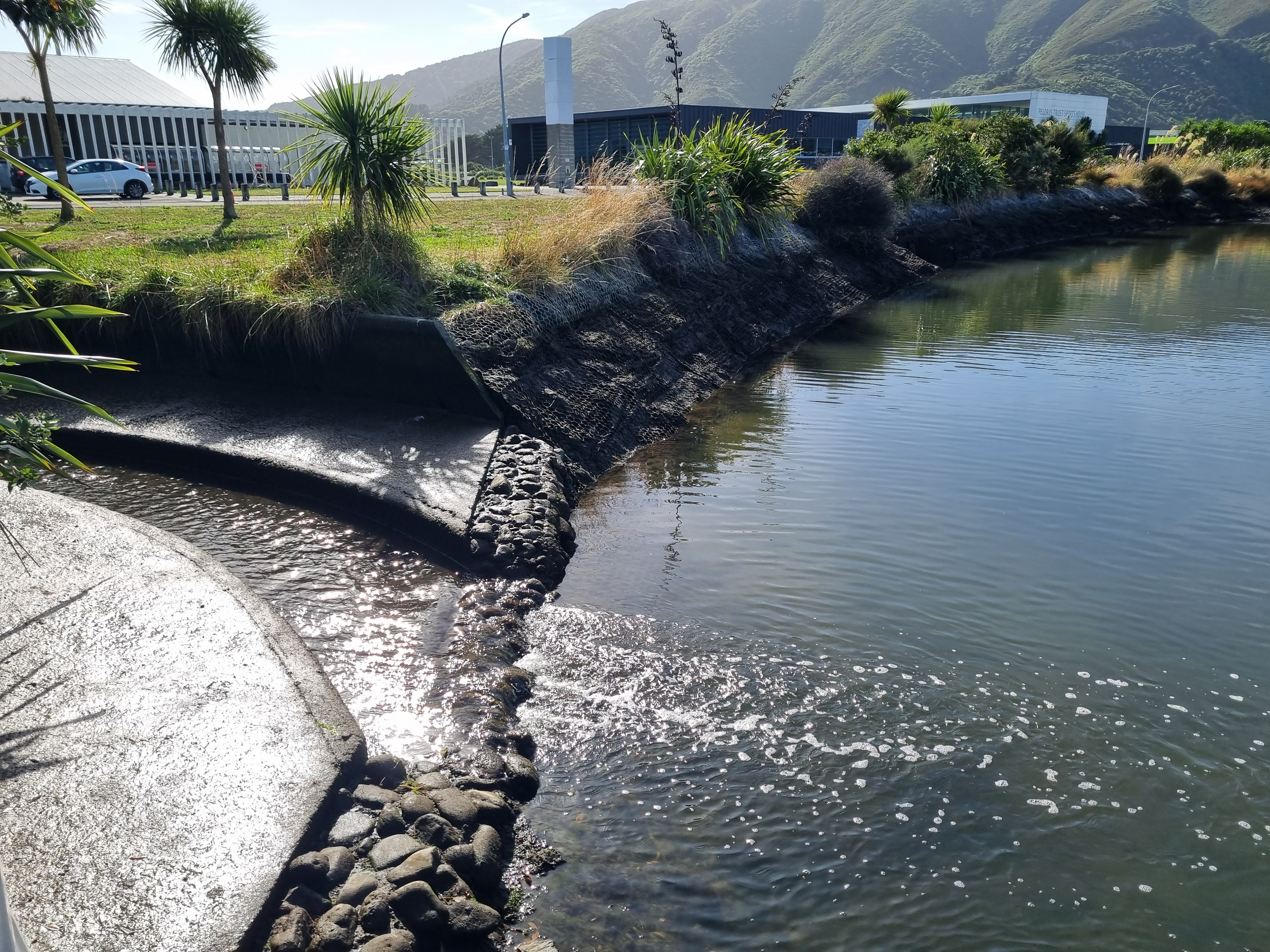
Awamutu Stream joins the Waiwhetū Stream at Seaview

In 1904, there was strong criticism of the Health Department for allowing the continuing discharge of sewage from thousands of patrons at the Hutt Park racecourse into the lower reaches of the Waiwhetū Stream. There were reports of illegal dumping into the Waiwhetū Stream as early as 1928. In 1926, the Government accepted tenders for the construction of new railway workshops in an industrial area close to the Waiwhetū Stream. In April 1929, the Lower Hutt Borough Council made a provision of £6,250 for the construction of septic tanks near the outlet of the Waiwhetū Stream. In 1936, an abatement notice was issued to the flock mill to cease the discharge of dust into the stream. In 1936, 1937 and 1938, there were multiple complaints from the caretaker of Hutt Park and the Hutt River Board's engineer that the stream was being polluted by a continuing discharge of oil from the railway workshops. By 1938, children were forbidden from swimming in the stream.

Development in the Hutt Valley and urbanisation led to clearing of vegetation on the banks of the stream, and changes to its natural contours. It became polluted and was affected by illegal rubbish dumping. The lower reaches were polluted with industrial discharges, including dyes from an adjacent carpet factory. In 1972, the stream caught fire because of the quantity of solvents that were being discharged.

A Waiwhetū Stream Working Group was formed in 2000 to advocate for the restoration of the stream. In 2003, a report on the state of the environment published by Greater Wellington Regional Council listed Waiwhetū Stream as one of the five most polluted streams in the region.

In July 2021, the stream was polluted with the discharge of untreated sewage from pumping stations for a short period following exceptionally heavy rainfall. During another heavy rainfall event in December 2021, there was another emergency discharge of sewage from a pumping station into the stream, leading to protests from local Māori.

=== Clearing the stream (1920s–1940) ===
The Hutt River Board called tenders in November 1925 for clearing the upper reaches of the stream. In 1928, the Hutt River Board agreed to the clearing of the stream between the road bridge and the outlet. Later in 1929, the Hutt River Board commenced work on deepening and clearing the outlet of the stream.

In 1931, the Hutt River Board reported that it had spent £1,000 in the previous 12 months on dredging the Waiwhetū Stream. In 1935, the Hutt Park committee received support from the Department of Lands and Survey for a project to plant trees on either side of Waiwhetū Stream in the vicinity of Hutt Park.

== Restoration (from 2010) ==
=== Removal of toxic waste ===
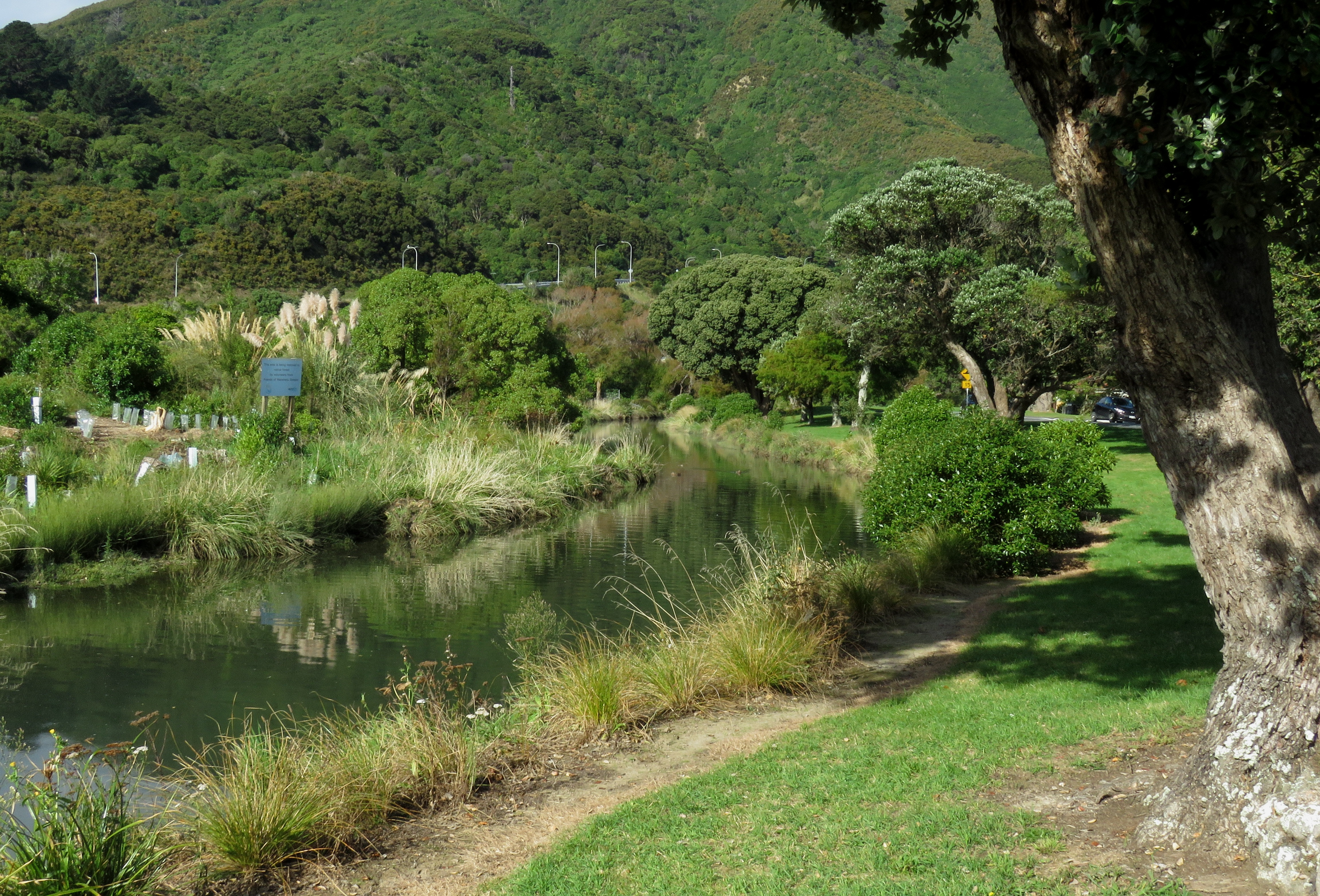
Waiwhetū Stream between Waiwhetū and Gracefield

The lower reaches of the stream had been used as an industrial sewer. In 2001, despite 20 years having passed since the closure of the trade waste discharges from the industries in the area, the river was still highly polluted with toxic sediments. Mud in the stream bed down to a depth of 1.5 metres (4 ft 11 in) was heavily contaminated with lead, zinc, DDT and hydrocarbons including diesel, oil and petrol. In 2003, it was estimated that there was 30,000 cubic metres (1,100,000 cu ft) of heavily contaminated sediment in a short section of the stream between Seaview Road and the rail bridge just north of Hutt Park Holiday Village. Local groups urged that a cleanup be undertaken.

A major cleanup project commenced in 2009 to remove 12,000 cubic metres (420,000 cu ft) of contaminated mud from the lower reaches of the stream. The work was funded by Hutt City Council, Greater Wellington Regional Council and the Ministry for the Environment, and cost over $20 million. At the time, the stream was described as one of the country's most polluted waterways. The cleanup was declared complete in June 2010, after the removal of 56,000 tonnes of toxic waste.

=== Restoration of the stream ===
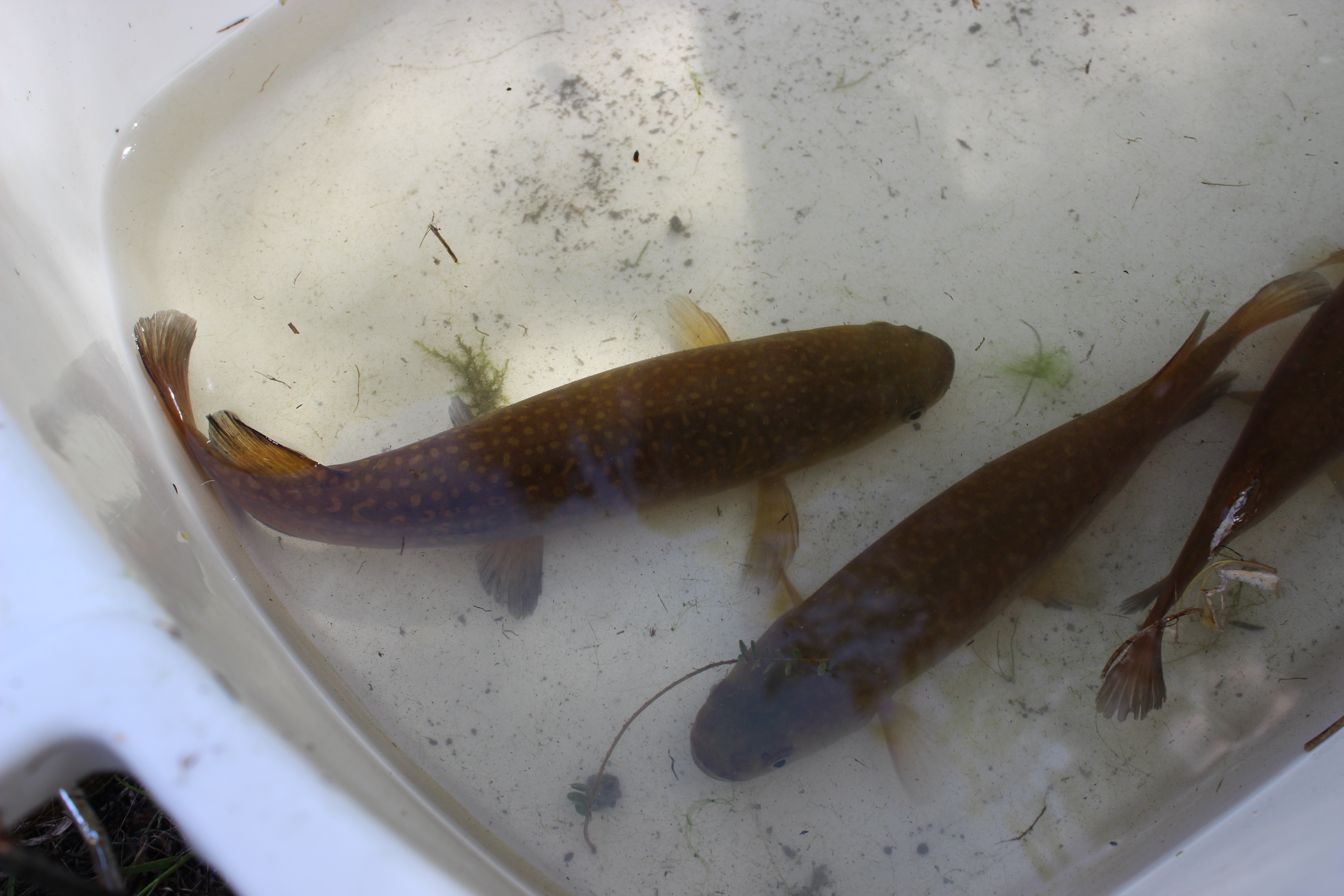
Giant kōkopu found in the 2018 fish survey

In 2010–2011, a volunteer group of residents was formed as the Friends of Waiwhetū Stream to act as guardians and take action to restore the upper reaches of the stream, with the support of the Greater Wellington Regional Council and Hutt City Council. One of the early tasks undertaken was the removal of the invasive aquatic plant Cape pond weed that had smothered the stream and impeded water flows. Over a period of three years, volunteers removed by hand approximately 300,000 plants from 3.4 kilometres (2.1 mi) of the stream. In 2023, the Friends of Waiwhetū Stream reported that annual sweeps of the river had shown that there are no longer any Cape pond weed plants present. The group also controls other invasive plants on the banks of the stream such as tradescantia and blackberry, and contributes to surveys of fish and invertebrates in the stream.

Over the period from 2011 to 2021, volunteers planted 34,000 eco-sourced plants, along six kilometres (3.7 mi) of the stream's banks. From 2015-2017, two small projects were undertaken in Naenae on a stretch of the stream that had been turned into a concrete channel in the 1930s or 1940s. A section of concrete berm along the channel was removed and plants put in. Removing the concrete berm was expensive, so another solution tried was to plant the edges of the concrete berm to soften the edges of the stream. Rocks were placed into the stream channel to slow the flow of water, which enabled inanga to navigate upstream as well as creating a more attractive watercourse.

In April 2019, the Hutt City Council commissioned a mosaic mural that celebrates the return of flora and fauna following the restoration of the stream.

== Seaview wastewater treatment plant and outfall ==
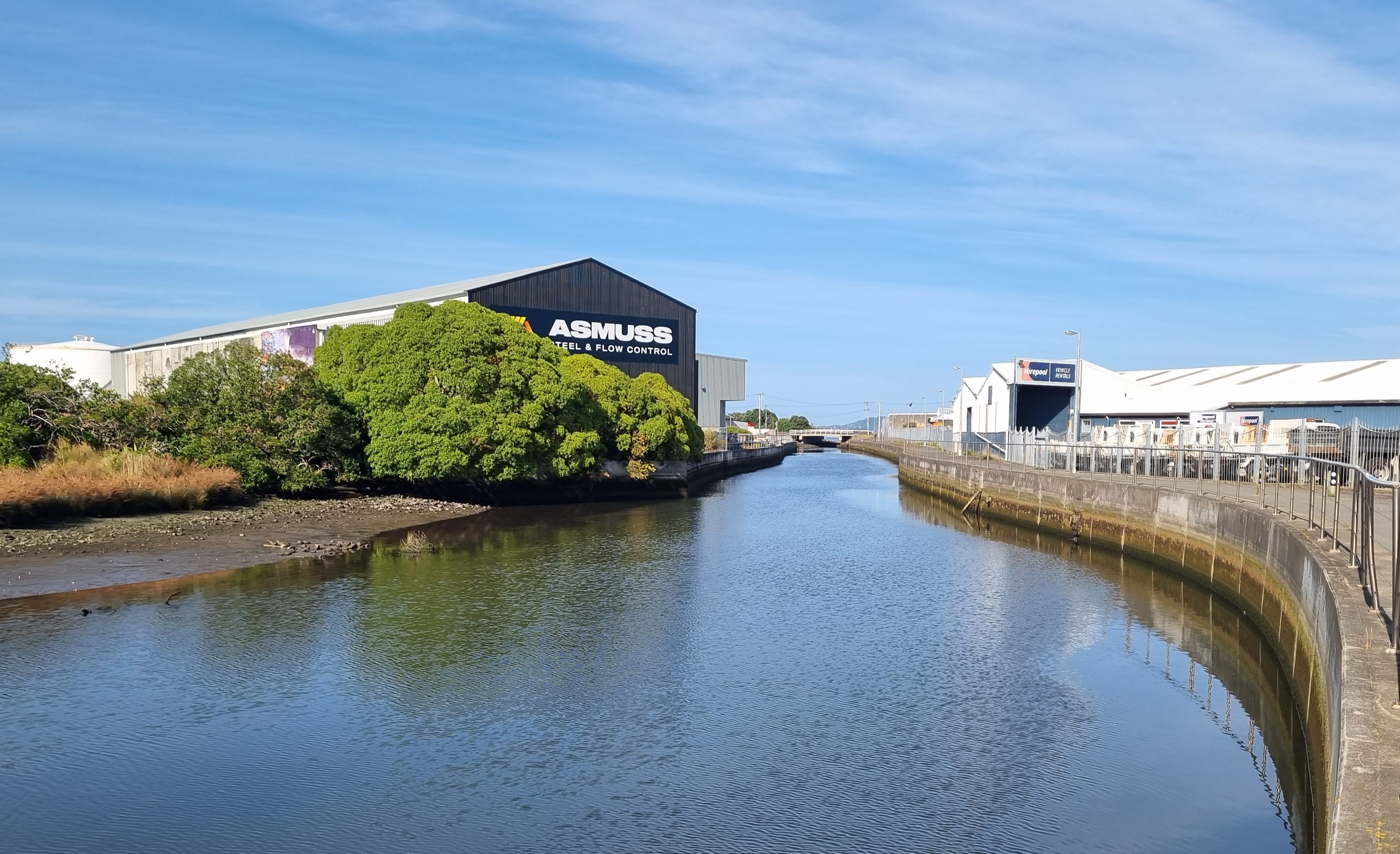
The lower reaches of the Waiwhetū Stream at Seaview. The stream joins the Hutt River at the bridge in the distance.

Prior to 2001, wastewater from the entire Hutt Valley was screened and then pumped without any further treatment via a pipeline along the eastern coastline of Wellington Harbour to an ocean outfall near the harbour entrance at Pencarrow Head. By the 1990s, the discharge of untreated sewage into the ocean had become environmentally unacceptable. Planning for a new sewage treatment plan began in the mid 1990s. In 1998, tenders were called for a design, build and operate contract for a treatment plant to be built in Seaview that would provide secondary treatment of all sewage from the Hutt Valley and Wainuiomata. It was to be located close to the Waiwhetū Stream. A contract was let in 1999, and the plant was commissioned in 2001.

In 2011, the Hutt City Council sought a 35 year consent for temporary discharges of treated effluent directly into the Waiwhetū Stream. These discharges would be required when maintenance was required on the main outfall pipeline. The temporary discharges cause pollution in the lower reaches of Waiwhetū Stream and in the estuary of the Hutt River, making it unsafe to collect shellfish, fish or swim in the area. The consent was opposed by the Friends of Waiwhetū Stream and local Māori.

In March 2022, Wellington Water reported a leak in the pipeline to the outfall, in the Seaview area. Repairs required the shutdown of the pipeline, and the discharge of fully treated wastewater into Waiwhetū Stream while the repairs were carried out. In September 2023, Wellington Water predicted that pipeline shutdowns for repairs will become increasingly frequent, possibly rising to 30 times per year, with a typical repair time of 1 week, leading to repeated discharges of treated wastewater into the Waiwhetū Stream. Options presented to the Hutt City and Upper Hutt councils included refurbishment of the existing pipeline, or the construction of a new pipeline in Wellington Harbour. The forecast costs of a new outfall pipeline were approximately $700 million, with a further $300 million required for upgrades to the Seaview treatment plant, including a replacement sludge drier.

== See also ==
- List of rivers of Wellington Region
- List of rivers of New Zealand
