= The White Swan Hotel, Greytown =

Hotel in Greytown, New Zealand

The White Swan Hotel
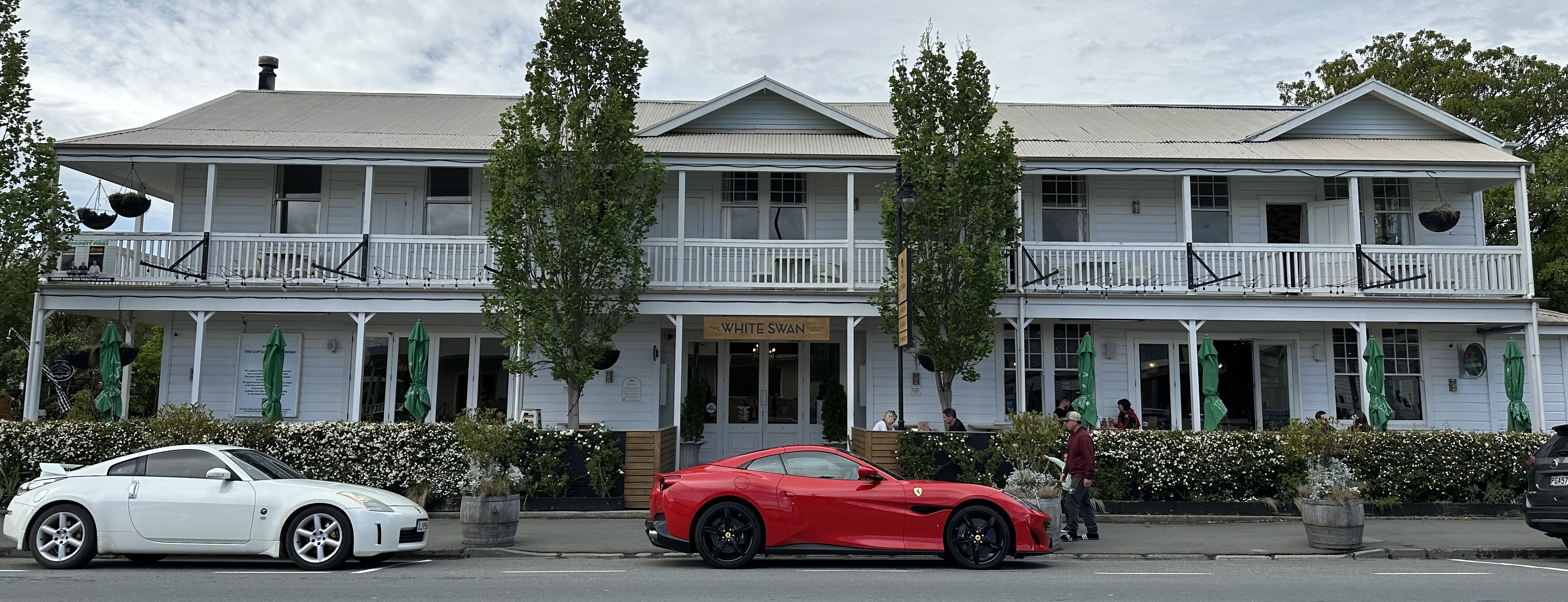

General information
- Architectural style: Victorian
- Location: 109 Main Street, Greytown
- Coordinates: 41.0808°S 175.4601°E
- Year built: 1905
- Relocated: December 2002

Website
- thewhiteswanhotel.co.nz

The White Swan Hotel is a Victorian-style hotel building in Greytown, in the Wairarapa region of New Zealand.

The building was originally constructed in 1905 as a railways administration block at the Hutt Workshops in Woburn, Lower Hutt. A new site for the building was purchased in 2001 on Main Street, Greytown. The intention was to provide accommodation at the higher end of the market, and attract weekend visitors from Wellington. The former railways building was cut into six sections for transport over the Remutaka Hill road. During the transport of one of the sections in December 2002, the transport trailer was knocked off balance by a particularly strong gust of wind. Both lanes of the Remutaka Hill road were closed for more than four hours, and a crane had to be brought in to rescue the load.

The renovated building was opened as The White Swan Hotel in October 2003, and included a restaurant, bar and seven themed rooms on the upper floor. Additional accommodation was built at the rear of the hotel, providing another five rooms.

The name of the hotel is linked with the story of the rescue of the passengers and crew of the SS White Swan, a steamer that struck a rock off the Wairarapa coast south of Castlepoint, on 29 June 1862. The vessel was carrying 65 passengers and crew, including members of parliament and national documents for the inaugural meeting of parliament in Wellington. No lives were lost, but the vessel was wrecked.

The property was sold to investors in 2013, and the original leaseholder put the lease up for sale in 2014. The property owners took over the lease in 2015. In 2018 there was a fire in the roof of the building, but a prompt fire-fighting response contained the damage. The building lease was again listed for sale in 2019, and new proprietors took over in December 2019.

In December 2022, the hotel was recognised in the Wairarapa Business Awards, winning the Vibrant Award, and the overall Supreme Award.
