= Greytown, New Zealand =

Town in the North Island of New Zealand

Greytown Hūpēnui (Māori)
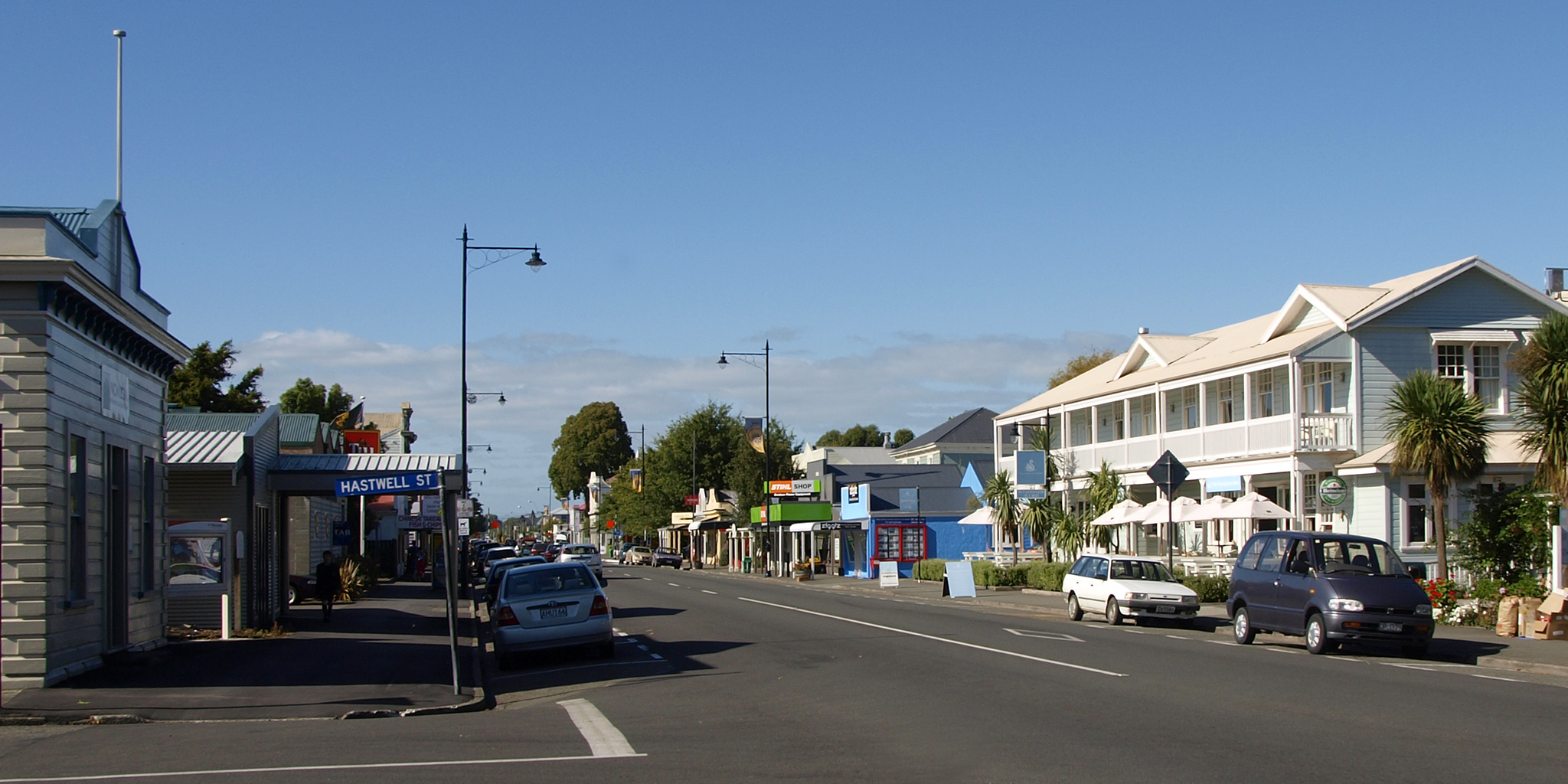
- Main street in Greytown
- Interactive map of Greytown
- Coordinates: 41.080°S 175.461°E
- Region: Wellington Region
- Territorial authority: South Wairarapa District
- Ward: Greytown Ward
- Community: Greytown Community
- Founded: 1854
- Named for: Sir George Grey
- Electorates: Wairarapa; Ikaroa-Rāwhiti (Māori)

Government
  - Territorial Authority: South Wairarapa District Council
  - Regional council: Greater Wellington Regional Council
  - Mayor of South Wairarapa: Fran Wilde
  - Wairarapa MP: TBD
  - Ikaroa-Rāwhiti MP: Cushla Tangaere-Manuel

Area
  - Total: 5.07 km^{2} (1.96 sq mi)

Population (June 2025)
  - Total: 2,840
  - Density: 560/km^{2} (1,450/sq mi)
- Time zone: UTC+12 (NZST)
  - Summer (DST): UTC+13 (NZDT)
- Postcode: 5712
- Area code: 06

Greytown (Māori: Hūpēnui), is a rural town in the South Wairarapa District in the lower North Island of New Zealand. It is 77 km (48 mi) by road north-east of Wellington and 24 km (15 mi) southwest of Masterton, travelling via State Highway 2.

== Etymology ==
The Māori name for Greytown is Hūpēnui, the literal translation of which is "the big snot", better translated as "the fluid that comes out of your nose at a tangi or funeral".

== History and culture ==
=== European settlement ===
Greytown was first settled on 27 March 1854 under the Small Farms Association Settlement Scheme and was named after Governor Sir George Grey, who arranged for the land to be bought from local Māori. It became a Borough in 1878 and a ward of the South Wairarapa District Council in 1989.

The first Arbor Day celebration in New Zealand was held in Greytown on 3 July 1890. Greytown Beautification Society has done a lot to keep the spirit alive for many years, especially Stella Bull Park and the park bench in the park dedicated to her, which states, "Only God can make a Tree". The town has many beautiful trees and a register is kept to help protect them. The Tree Advisory Group to the Greytown Community Board actively works to preserve trees and the historic tree register is in the process of being updated in collaboration with the Greytown Community Board and South Wairarapa District Council.

==== Samuel Oates Gum Tree ====
In 1856, Wellington worker Samuel Oates made the trip over the Remutaka Range for employment. Oates brought with him a wooden wheelbarrow, which carried tools along with 12 gum tree saplings intended for delivery to Carterton — thought to be the first mail delivery over the range by vehicle. Upon reaching Greytown, Oates visited the Rising Sun Hotel, leaving the wheelbarrow and its contents outside. While Oates was in the hotel, three of the gum trees were taken from the wheelbarrow. It was not until many years later that one of the missing trees was found growing outside St Luke's Anglican Church on the main road. At over 160 years old, the tree now stands at 40 metres tall, and was a finalist in the 2025 New Zealand Tree of the Year competition.

== Demographics ==
Greytown covers 5.07 km^{2} (1.96 sq mi) and had an estimated population of 2,840 as of June 2025, with a population density of 560 people per km^{2}.

Historical population
Year	Pop.	±% p.a.
2006	2,103	—
2013	2,238	+0.89%
2018	2,466	+1.96%
2023	2,772	+2.37%

Greytown had a population of 2,772 in the 2023 New Zealand census, an increase of 306 people (12.4%) since the 2018 census, and an increase of 534 people (23.9%) since the 2013 census. There were 1,335 males, 1,431 females, and 6 people of other genders in 1,212 dwellings. 3.0% of people identified as LGBTIQ+. The median age was 51.9 years (compared with 38.1 years nationally). There were 465 people (16.8%) aged under 15 years, 243 (8.8%) aged 15 to 29, 1,224 (44.2%) aged 30 to 64, and 843 (30.4%) aged 65 or older.

People could identify as more than one ethnicity. The results were 93.7% European (Pākehā); 9.1% Māori; 2.2% Pasifika; 2.9% Asian; 0.6% Middle Eastern, Latin American and African New Zealanders (MELAA); and 1.8% other, which includes people giving their ethnicity as "New Zealander". English was spoken by 98.4%, Māori by 1.5%, Samoan by 0.1%, and other languages by 7.8%. No language could be spoken by 1.5% (e.g. too young to talk). New Zealand Sign Language was known by 0.4%. The percentage of people born overseas was 19.5, compared with 28.8% nationally.

Religious affiliations were 30.5% Christian, 0.4% Hindu, 0.3% Māori religious beliefs, 0.5% Buddhist, 0.3% New Age, 0.2% Jewish, and 1.2% other religions. People who answered that they had no religion were 59.6%, and 6.9% of people did not answer the census question.

Of those at least 15 years old, 741 (32.1%) people had a bachelor's or higher degree, 1,125 (48.8%) had a post-high school certificate or diploma, and 441 (19.1%) people exclusively held high school qualifications. The median income was $42,800, compared with $41,500 nationally. 435 people (18.9%) earned over $100,000 compared to 12.1% nationally. The employment status of those at least 15 was 1,029 (44.6%) full-time, 363 (15.7%) part-time, and 33 (1.4%) unemployed.

== Economy ==
=== Tourism ===
Greytown is a popular weekend and holiday destination. It was awarded the title of New Zealand's Most Beautiful Small Town 2017 (pop less than 5,000).

The main street has a number of boutique, antique stores and cafés. The official camping ground next to the soldiers' memorial park is very popular during long weekends and holidays. Swimming is free at the Greytown Memorial Park which remains a monument to the men of Greytown who gave their lives in both World Wars. Within the park are 117 lime trees, planted in 1922 to commemorate the 117 soldiers from the community who died in WW1. With cycling becoming increasingly popular the Woodside Rail Trail is a regular spot for visitors. The 5 km (3.1 mi) rail trail passes through quiet farmland, native plantings and heritage trees to Woodside Station, with great views of the Tararua Ranges.

==== Festival of Christmas ====
Following the first COVID-19 lockdowns in 2020, the town began hosting the Wairarapa Festival of Christmas in July to boost tourism in the area, providing an experience evocative of a wintertime Christmas in the Northern Hemisphere. The month-long festival includes lighting displays, markets, workshops, and family activities. The annual event attracts tens of thousands of visitors and brings in more than $4.5 million into the region’s economy. In 2025, the festival was named as the winner of the Vibrant Gold category in the Wellington Gold Awards, after previously being crowned Supreme Winner at the 2023 Wairarapa Awards.

=== Horticulture ===
Greytown was marketed as "The fruit bowl of the Wairarapa" when fruit was grown on the west of the town with orchards like Westhaven and Pinehaven.

== Image and architecture ==
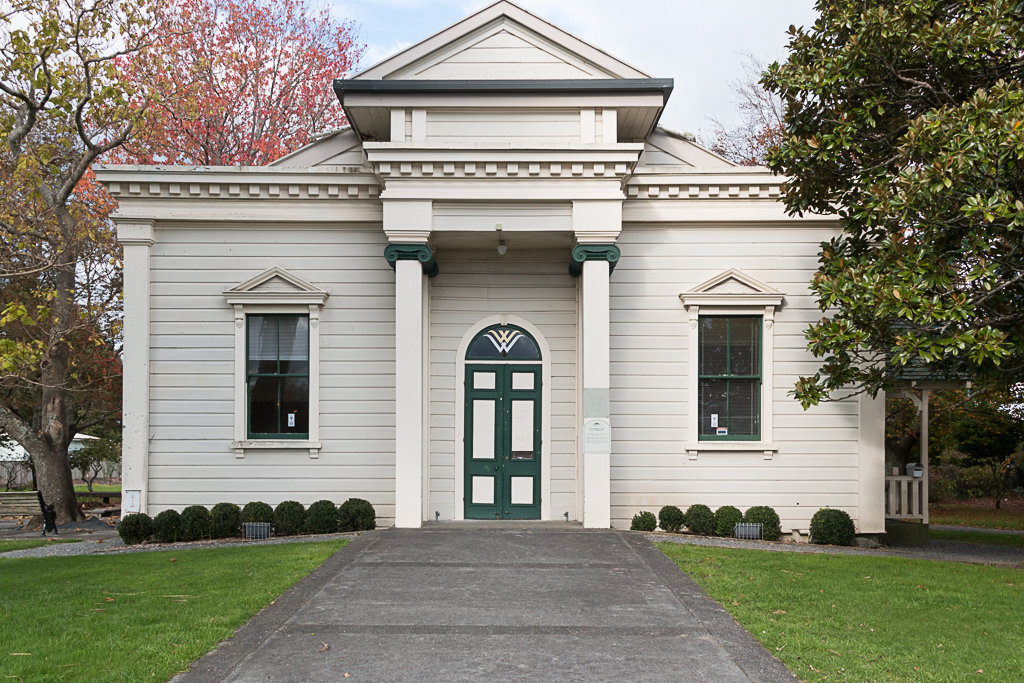
First Masonic Hall

The town is proud of its history, claiming to have the most complete main street of Victorian architecture in the country, and of being the first planned inland town. It has played on these assets, creating a revival largely based on its architecture. Retailers like the butcher have changed their 1970s street frontage to a more Victorian one. The town recognises that buildings need to be maintained in order to maintain the town's charm and in 2016–2017 six significant building were restored/painted. This formed part of Greytown's submission for the most beautiful small town in New Zealand.

Cobblestones Museum, a regional history museum, on 167 Main Street, contains six Historic Places Trust category 2 buildings. In 2014 it opened a new exhibition building which showcases Greytown and Wairarapa history. It has embarked on an ambitious plan to restore all the listed buildings under conservation plans and now ranks as the top thing to see in Greytown on Trip Advisor.

Heritage buildings are recorded by the Greytown Heritage Trust. The Greytown Heritage Trust was formed with the primary object of encouraging and facilitating the preservation of historic buildings in and around Greytown, with particular attention being given to the Greytown Historic Heritage Precinct as defined in the Wairarapa Combined District Plan. The Greytown Hotel claims to be one of New Zealand's oldest surviving hotels.

One of the Victorian-style buildings on Main Street is The White Swan Hotel. This building was originally constructed in 1905 as a railways administration block in Woburn, Lower Hutt. In 2002, it was cut into six sections, transported over the Remutaka Hill road, re-assembled and renovated to become a hotel, restaurant and bar.

== Transport ==
The town is linked to Wellington and Masterton by New Zealand State Highway 2, a scenic mountain route peaking at the Remutaka summit.

The town was previously linked to Wellington and Masterton by a branch rail line.

In the 1870s, when the Public Works Department announced that the Wairarapa Line railway between Featherston and Masterton was not going to pass through Greytown, local protests were successful in attaining approval for a branch line from the Wairarapa Line at Woodside, which opened on 14 May 1880. For a few months Greytown was the terminus of the Wairarapa Line, but once the extension from Woodside to Masterton opened on 1 November 1880, the branch was one of the quietest railway lines in the country.

The branch line closed on 24 December 1953, and at the time of closure its revenue was only a tenth of its operating costs. Greytown passengers are now serviced by Woodside Railway Station on the Wairarapa Line.

== Education ==
Greytown has two schools:

- Greytown School is a state full primary (Year 1–8) school with 309 students as of July 2026. It was established in 1857. It added a secondary department in 1905, becoming Greytown District High School. The District High School merged with others to form Kuranui College in 1960.
- Kuranui College is a state secondary (Year 9–13) school with 762 students as of July 2026. It was established in 1960, replacing the district high schools in Carterton, Greytown, Featherston and Martinborough.

== Sport ==
Greytown Rugby club, established in 1877, is one of the oldest in the country. New Zealand rugby representatives from the Greytown club were:

- Hart Udy (1884)
- Dan Udy (1901–03)
- Rawi Cundy (1929)
- Clinton Stringfellow (1929)
- Ben Couch (1947–49)
- Marty Berry (1986–93)

Cricket has a long history in Greytown. On New Year's Day 1867, festivities at Greytown included men's and women's cricket matches – the first known instance of women's cricket in New Zealand. Greytown Cricket Club, established later in 1867, is the second-oldest cricket club in New Zealand, and 10 years older than Test cricket. It has been the powerhouse of the Wairarapa competition, with all three Senior teams winning their competitions in the 2005–06 season, and almost repeating the feat (two out of three) in 2006–07.

There are over 30 sports clubs in Greytown which come under the umbrella of Greytown Community Sport and Leisure Society, a volunteer organisation.

The Wellington Gliding Club operates from the Greytown Soaring Centre in Papawai, approximately 4 km east of Greytown on Tilsons Road.
