= Moera =

Suburb of Lower Hutt, New Zealand

- Suburb
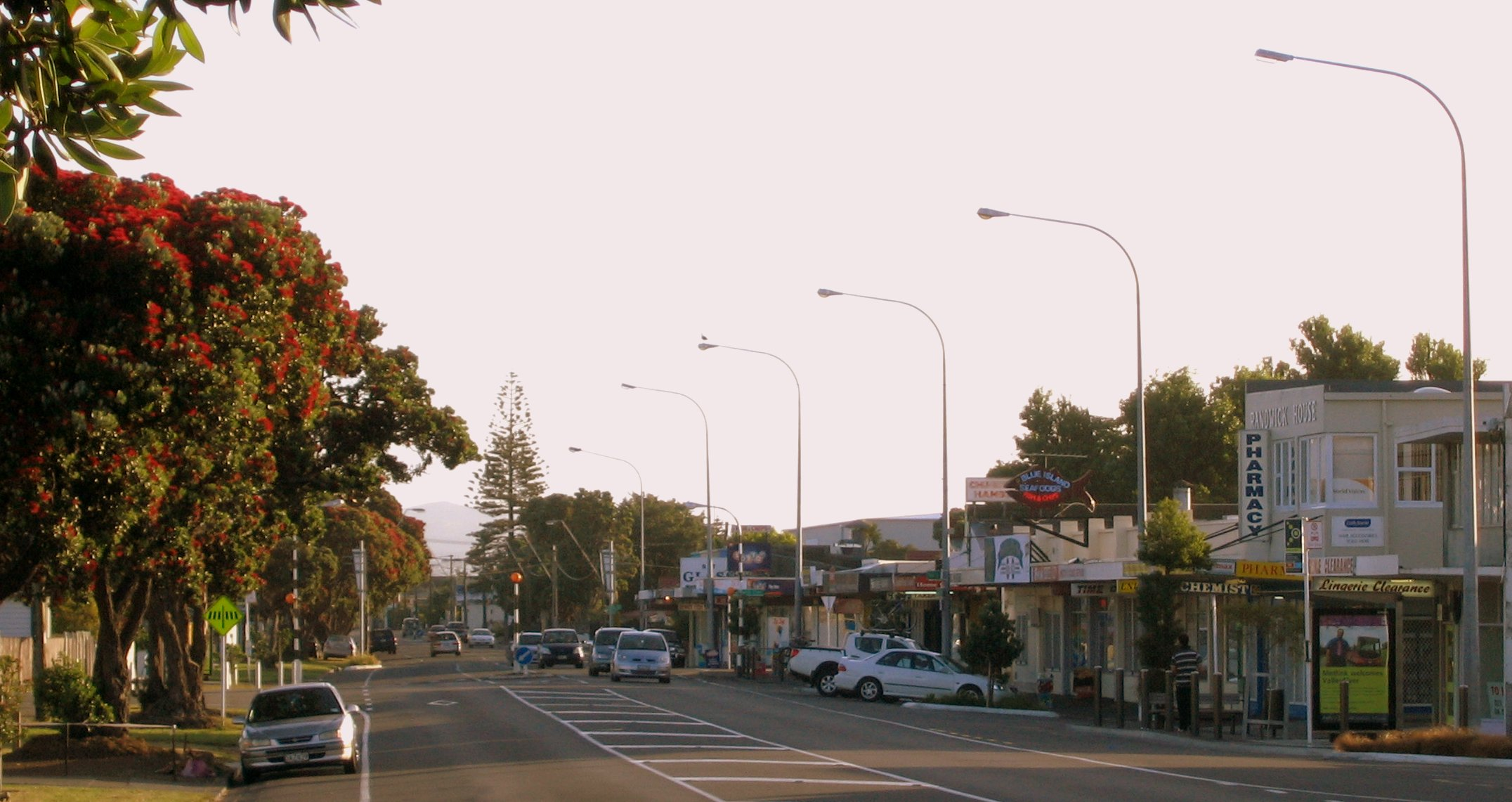
- Randwick Road, Moera
- Interactive map of Moera
- Coordinates: 41.230°S 174.905°E
- Country: New Zealand
- City: Lower Hutt
- Local authority: Hutt City Council
- Electoral ward: Harbour
- Established: 1920s

Area
  - Land: 63 ha (160 acres)

Population (June 2025)
  - Total: 1,850
  - Density: 2,900/km^{2} (7,600/sq mi)

Ava	Woburn	Waiwhetū
Petone	Moera	Gracefield
	Seaview

Moera, a suburb of the city of Lower Hutt in New Zealand, forms part of the urban area of greater Wellington.

== Location ==
Located at the south-eastern end of the Hutt River, the suburb's name Moera is thought to be a simplification of Moe-i-te-ra, meaning "sleeping in the sun".

== History ==
Prior to European settlement, the Moera area was part of a large tidal estuary at the mouth of the Awamutu and Waiwhetū Streams. The southern side of Waiwhetū Stream contained a number of Ngati Ira villages.

In 1843 William Trotter settled in the area and established a fruit garden and nursery. The 1855 Wairarapa earthquake raised the Hutt Valley from 1 to 2 metres, thus draining the swampy estuary.

The area remained farmland up until 1926 when the Petone Railway Workshops were moved to Moera and Government sponsored prefabricated workers housing, built by the Railways Department, were sold to families.

== Influence ==
Typical Moera railway Cottage

To house workers almost 600 kitset homes were built to a simple 5 room layout. The whole project was completed by May 1927. These provided a template for State housing developments in later years.

Many of the current houses are original Railways Department built prefabricated cottages dating from that era.

== Features ==
Moera was home to the Hutt Park Raceway from the 1860s, until Harness and Greyhound racing ceased at the park in 2003, The 12 Hectare park area has since been established as a sports and recreation ground, including a 7 court indoor sports centre and indoor children's playground.

The park lies between the southern industrial area of Lower Hutt and the residential suburb of Moera and is bounded by the Waiwhetu Stream, Gracefield railway line and Randwick Road.

A number of neighbouring facilities, sites and properties are complementary to the park. These include private commercial properties between Seaview Road and the Waiwhetu Stream, the Seaview Urupa, and walkways that link to the Hutt River and Waiwhetu Stream.

== Demographics ==
Moera statistical area covers 0.63 km^{2} (0.24 sq mi). It had an estimated population of 1,850 as of June 2025, with a population density of 2,937 people per km^{2}.

Historical population
Year	Pop.	±% p.a.
2006	1,608	—
2013	1,533	−0.68%
2018	1,626	+1.18%
2023	1,734	+1.29%

Moera had a population of 1,734 in the 2023 New Zealand census, an increase of 108 people (6.6%) since the 2018 census, and an increase of 201 people (13.1%) since the 2013 census. There were 858 males, 867 females, and 6 people of other genders in 669 dwellings. 4.2% of people identified as LGBTIQ+. The median age was 35.8 years (compared with 38.1 years nationally). There were 324 people (18.7%) aged under 15 years, 345 (19.9%) aged 15 to 29, 867 (50.0%) aged 30 to 64, and 198 (11.4%) aged 65 or older.

People could identify as more than one ethnicity. The results were 48.1% European (Pākehā); 31.7% Māori; 14.4% Pasifika; 23.5% Asian; 3.5% Middle Eastern, Latin American and African New Zealanders (MELAA); and 1.7% other, which includes people giving their ethnicity as "New Zealander". English was spoken by 92.2%, Māori by 9.0%, Samoan by 2.4%, and other languages by 20.9%. No language could be spoken by 2.9% (e.g. too young to talk). New Zealand Sign Language was known by 0.7%. The percentage of people born overseas was 28.7, compared with 28.8% nationally.

Religious affiliations were 29.4% Christian, 8.0% Hindu, 2.4% Islam, 3.8% Māori religious beliefs, 0.7% Buddhist, 0.7% New Age, 0.3% Jewish, and 1.9% other religions. People who answered that they had no religion were 47.8%, and 6.1% of people did not answer the census question.

Of those at least 15 years old, 324 (23.0%) people had a bachelor's or higher degree, 639 (45.3%) had a post-high school certificate or diploma, and 453 (32.1%) people exclusively held high school qualifications. The median income was $36,500, compared with $41,500 nationally. 129 people (9.1%) earned over $100,000 compared to 12.1% nationally. The employment status of those at least 15 was 714 (50.6%) full-time, 150 (10.6%) part-time, and 90 (6.4%) unemployed.

== Education ==
Randwick School is a co-educational state primary school for Year 1 to 8 students, with a roll of 112 as of July 2026. It opened in 1929.
