= Keston Institute =

The Keston Institute (Keston College) is an organisation dedicated to the study of religion and communist countries, previously based in Oxford, England. It is now located at Baylor University in Waco, Texas. The Center for Religion, Politics, and Society was founded in 1969 by the Revd Canon Michael Bourdeaux (19 March 1934 – 29 March 2021).

== History ==
In the 1950s, Michael Bourdeaux spent a year in Moscow as a part of the first wave of British exchange students; he soon found only 41 Russian Orthodox Churches to still be functioning out of the 1,600 before the Russian Revolution in 1917. This prompted him to take up the cause of those persecuted for their religious faith.

In 1969 Bourdeaux founded at Chislehurst the Centre for the Study of Religion and Communism together with Sir John Lawrence, and with the help of Leonard Schapiro and Peter Reddaway, later Professor of Political Science and International Affairs at George Washington University. In the early 1970s it bought the old parish school on Keston Common and the centre was renamed Keston College. Later it broadened its purview to include former communist countries with its main concerns being the former Soviet Union and the Eastern Bloc. Over the years it played a key role in the revival of the Russian Orthodox Church, and has become a leading voice on religious freedom in former communist countries, with an emphasis on the former Soviet Union. Eventually the enterprise was relocated to Oxford at the urging of Nicholas Goodrick-Clarke, after which it renamed itself to the Keston Institute (not being a college in the Oxford sense).

In 1984 Michael Bourdeaux won the Templeton Prize. Bourdeaux retired from Keston in 1999. The current chairman at the Keston Institute is Xenia Dennen.

Since 2007, the Keston Institute's archive and library have been under the care of the Keston Center for Religion, Politics, & Society at Baylor University, Waco, Texas.

== See also ==
- Giles Udy
