= Epuni =

Suburb of Lower Hutt, New Zealand

- Suburb
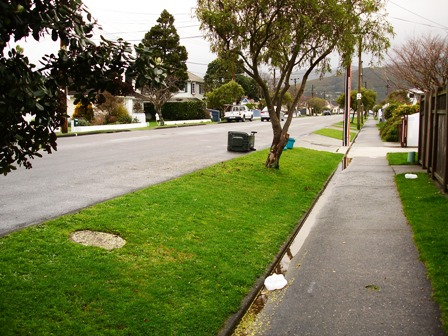
- Epuni Street
- Interactive map of Epuni
- Coordinates: 41.208°S 174.930°E
- Country: New Zealand
- City: Lower Hutt
- Local authority: Hutt City Council
- Electoral ward: Central

Area
  - Land: 199 ha (490 acres)

Population (June 2025)
  - Total: 6,940
  - Density: 3,490/km^{2} (9,030/sq mi)
- Train stations: Epuni Station

| | Boulcott | Naenae |
| Hutt Central | Epuni | Fairfield |
| Waterloo |

Epuni is a suburb of Lower Hutt, situated in the Wellington region of New Zealand. The suburb lies around one kilometre east of the Lower Hutt CBD.

The suburb takes its name from the Te Āti Awa chief Honiana Te Puni.

In 2018 HNZ, which in October 2019 became part of Kaingaora Ora Homes and Communities, announced that it was to build 153 homes on long-vacant land in Epuni where earlier HNZ houses had been demolished.

== Demographics ==
Epuni, comprising the statistical areas of Epuni West and Epuni East, covers 1.99 km^{2} (0.77 sq mi). It had an estimated population of 6,940 as of June 2025, with a population density of 3,487 people per km^{2}.

Historical population
| Year | Pop. | ±% p.a. |
|---|---|---|
| 2006 | 6,063 | — |
| 2013 | 5,892 | −0.41% |
| 2018 | 6,039 | +0.49% |
| 2023 | 6,441 | +1.30% |

Epuni had a population of 6,441 in the 2023 New Zealand census, an increase of 402 people (6.7%) since the 2018 census, and an increase of 549 people (9.3%) since the 2013 census. There were 3,102 males, 3,312 females, and 24 people of other genders in 2,412 dwellings. 3.5% of people identified as LGBTIQ+. The median age was 37.7 years (compared with 38.1 years nationally). There were 1,191 people (18.5%) aged under 15 years, 1,143 (17.7%) aged 15 to 29, 3,069 (47.6%) aged 30 to 64, and 1,035 (16.1%) aged 65 or older.

People could identify as more than one ethnicity. The results were 58.2% European (Pākehā); 14.5% Māori; 9.1% Pasifika; 26.5% Asian; 3.8% Middle Eastern, Latin American and African New Zealanders (MELAA); and 2.5% other, which includes people giving their ethnicity as "New Zealander". English was spoken by 94.1%, Māori by 3.5%, Samoan by 3.4%, and other languages by 24.0%. No language could be spoken by 2.4% (e.g. too young to talk). New Zealand Sign Language was known by 0.7%. The percentage of people born overseas was 32.8, compared with 28.8% nationally.

Religious affiliations were 34.0% Christian, 6.1% Hindu, 4.1% Islam, 0.8% Māori religious beliefs, 1.7% Buddhist, 0.3% New Age, and 2.1% other religions. People who answered that they had no religion were 45.3%, and 5.9% of people did not answer the census question.

Of those at least 15 years old, 1,683 (32.1%) people had a bachelor's or higher degree, 2,319 (44.2%) had a post-high school certificate or diploma, and 1,248 (23.8%) people exclusively held high school qualifications. The median income was $45,700, compared with $41,500 nationally. 828 people (15.8%) earned over $100,000 compared to 12.1% nationally. The employment status of those at least 15 was 2,805 (53.4%) full-time, 669 (12.7%) part-time, and 156 (3.0%) unemployed.

Individual statistical areas
| Name | Area (km^{2}) | Population | Density (per km^{2}) | Dwellings | Median age | Median income |
|---|---|---|---|---|---|---|
| Epuni West | 0.99 | 3,267 | 3,300 | 1,263 | 38.9 years | $44,000 |
| Epuni East | 1.00 | 3,174 | 3,174 | 1,149 | 36.4 years | $47,100 |
| New Zealand | | | | | 38.1 years | $41,500 |

== Education ==
Dyer Street School is a co-educational state primary school for Year 1 to 6 students, with a roll of 189 as of October 2025. It opened in 1947.
