= Dan Udy =

- Born: Daniel Knight Udy; 21 May 1874 Greytown, New Zealand
- Died: 29 July 1935 (aged 61) Gore, New Zealand
- Weight: 89 kg (196 lb)
- Notable relative(s): Hart Udy (cousin); Hoani MacDonald (great-great-nephew)
- Occupation: Farmer

Rugby union career
- Position: Hooker
Provincial / State sides
Years	Team	Apps	(Points)
1894–1904	Wairarapa	49	
International career
Years	Team	Apps	(Points)
1901–03	New Zealand	1	(0)

Daniel Knight Udy (21 May 1874 – 29 July 1935) was a New Zealand rugby union player. A hooker, Udy represented Wairarapa at a provincial level, and was a member of the New Zealand national side, the All Blacks, from 1901 to 1903. He played nine matches for the All Blacks including one international.

A cousin Hart Udy represented New Zealand in 1884.
