= Lower Hutt Central Fire Station =

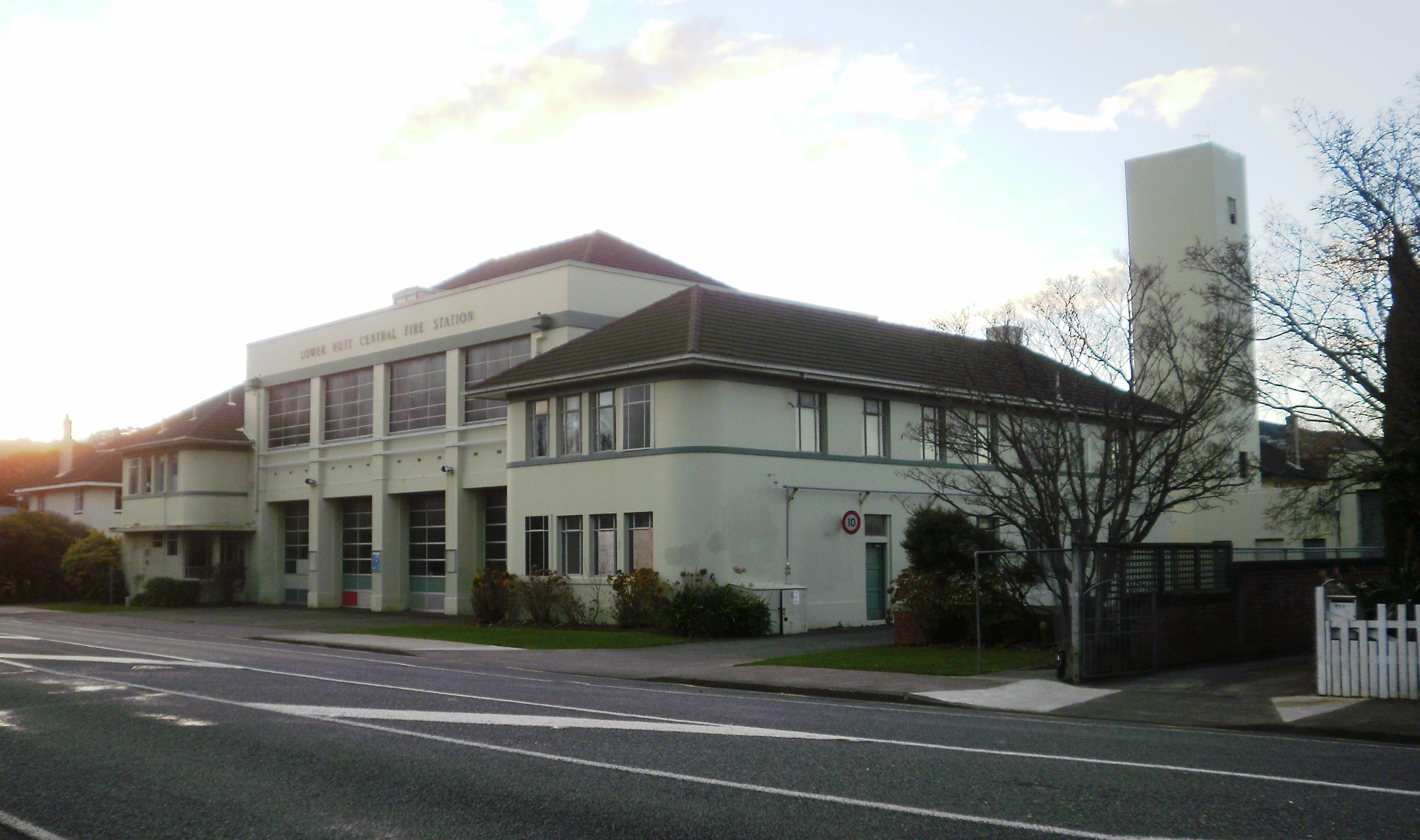
- Interactive map of the Lower Hutt Central Fire Station area

General information
- Type: Fire station
- Architectural style: Post-War modernist
- Location: 155 Waterloo Road, Lower Hutt, New Zealand
- Coordinates: 41.21014°S 174.91583°E
- Completed: 1955

Design and construction
- Architects: Mitchell & Mitchell & Partners; King, Cook & Dawson

Heritage New Zealand – Category 1
- Designated: 30-April-2010
- Reference no.: 9319

Lower Hutt Central Fire Station is a former fire station in Lower Hutt, New Zealand. When it was built in 1955 it was considered to be one of the most modern fire stations in the Southern Hemisphere.

The fire station is strongly influenced by the work of architect Frank Lloyd Wright. It was designed to represent a post war, modern city, with expanding industry and state housing projects.

The building along with the Lower Hutt town hall, civic administration building and war memorial library saw the city become a symbol of post-war modernist construction during the 1950s.

When the station first opened it included such features as a control room where the fire engines could be started and stopped remotely, and the appliance doors could open automatically. It was the first fire station in New Zealand to have the technology to record calls.

In the mid-2000s, the New Zealand Fire Service reviewed its coverage of Lower Hutt. On 15 January 2007, the station closed along with fire stations at Petone and Point Howard, with crews and engines split between three new stations at Alicetown, Avalon and Seaview. These three career stations are backed up by volunteer brigades at Stokes Valley, Wainuiomata and Eastbourne.

Since then, the building has been unoccupied and suffered from vandalism. In 2010 the station was officially protected from demolition by the New Zealand Historic Places Trust (since renamed to Heritage New Zealand).

The station was purchased by property developer Mike Friday in November 2015, who is planning to renovate the station into apartments.

== Gallery ==
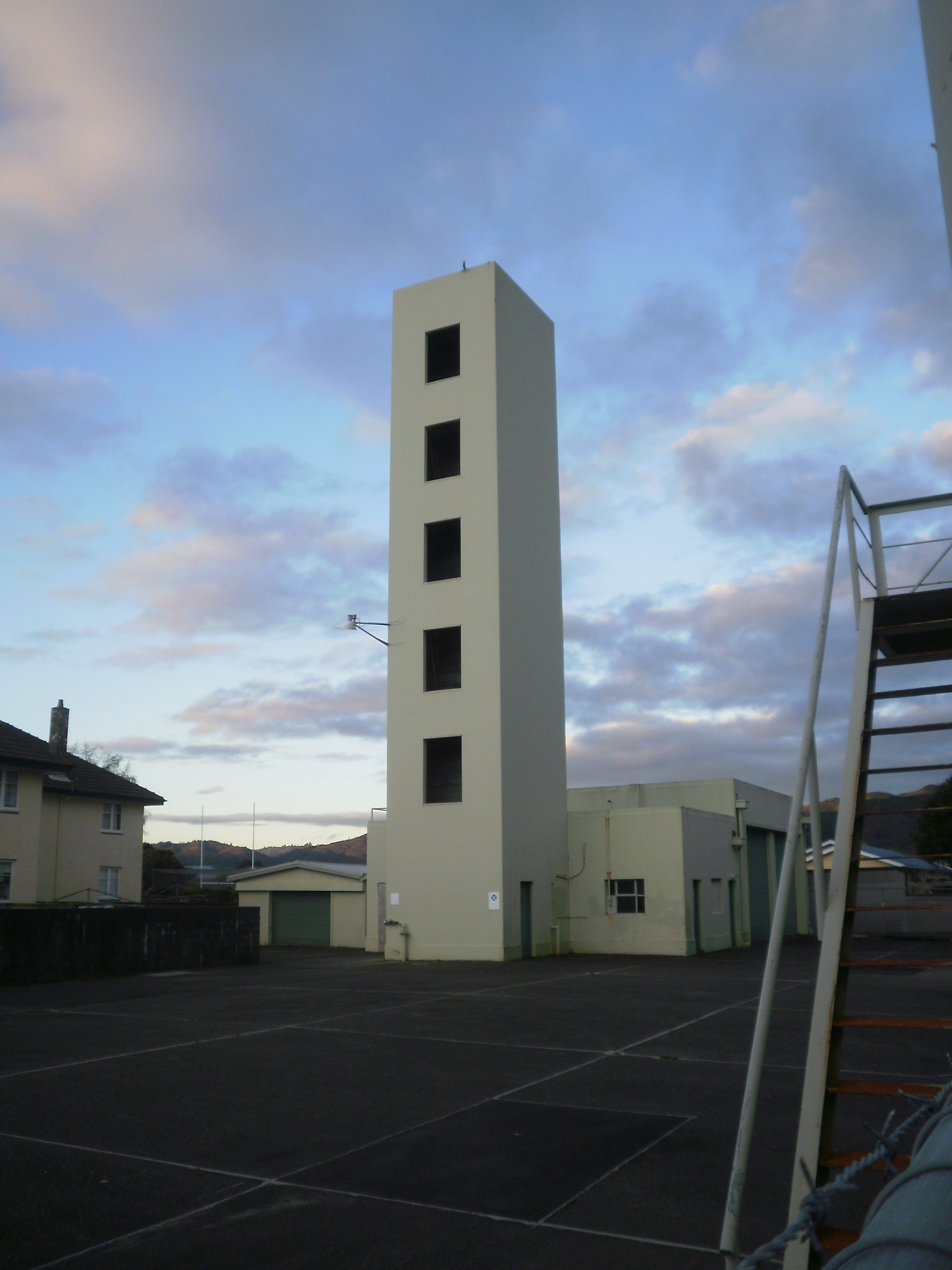
Fire tower at the back of the station
