= Waterloo, New Zealand =

Suburb of Lower Hutt, New Zealand

Waterloo
- Suburb
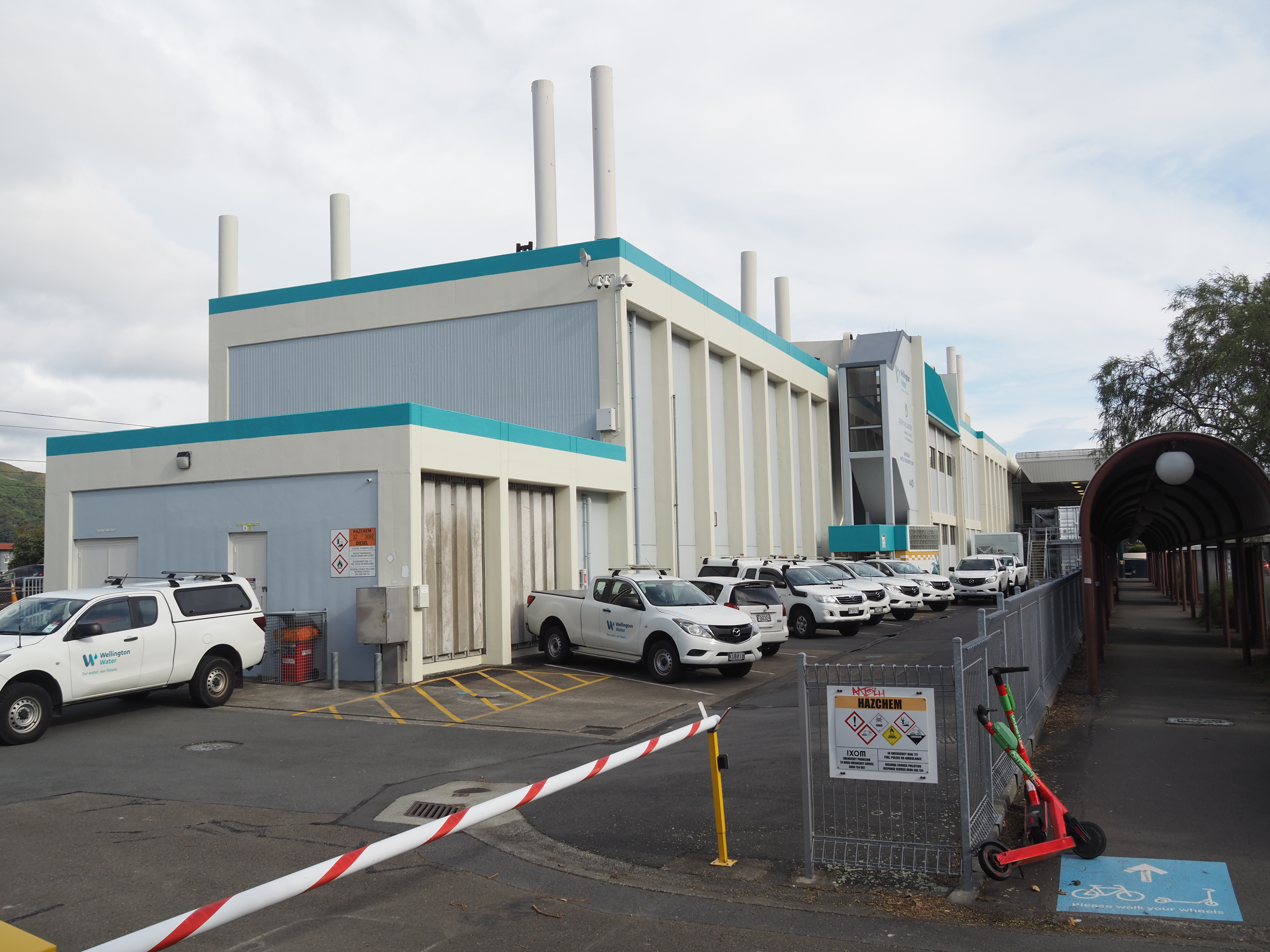
- Waterloo Water Treatment Plant
- Interactive map of Waterloo
- Coordinates: 41.217°S 174.926°E
- Country: New Zealand
- City: Lower Hutt
- Local authority: Hutt City Council
- Electoral ward: Central Ward

Area
  - Land: 181 ha (450 acres)

Population (June 2025)
  - Total: 5,830
  - Density: 3,220/km^{2} (8,340/sq mi)
- Train stations: Waterloo

Hutt Central	Epuni	Fairfield
Woburn	Waterloo
Waiwhetū

Waterloo is an eastern suburb of Lower Hutt, Wellington. It is named after the Battle of Waterloo won by the Duke of Wellington in 1815.

The Hutt City Council formally defines Waterloo as the area bounded by Waterloo Road and Burnside Street in the north, the Hutt Valley railway line in the west, Guthrie Street in the south, and the Wainuiomata hills in the east.

It is the home suburb to Waterloo Primary School and The Open Polytechnic of New Zealand. It is also home to Waterloo Interchange, a major train and bus station.

== Demographics ==
Waterloo, comprising the statistical areas of Waterloo West and Waterloo East, covers 1.81 km^{2} (0.70 sq mi). It had an estimated population of 5,830 as of June 2025, with a population density of 3,221 people per km^{2}.

Historical population
Year	Pop.	±% p.a.
2006	5,136	—
2013	5,124	−0.03%
2018	5,379	+0.98%
2023	5,508	+0.48%

Waterloo had a population of 5,508 in the 2023 New Zealand census, an increase of 129 people (2.4%) since the 2018 census, and an increase of 384 people (7.5%) since the 2013 census. There were 2,661 males, 2,826 females, and 21 people of other genders in 2,085 dwellings. 4.0% of people identified as LGBTIQ+. The median age was 39.7 years (compared with 38.1 years nationally). There were 975 people (17.7%) aged under 15 years, 1,032 (18.7%) aged 15 to 29, 2,682 (48.7%) aged 30 to 64, and 819 (14.9%) aged 65 or older.

People could identify as more than one ethnicity. The results were 66.4% European (Pākehā); 12.7% Māori; 6.9% Pasifika; 24.3% Asian; 2.0% Middle Eastern, Latin American and African New Zealanders (MELAA); and 1.5% other, which includes people giving their ethnicity as "New Zealander". English was spoken by 95.5%, Māori by 3.1%, Samoan by 1.7%, and other languages by 22.2%. No language could be spoken by 2.1% (e.g. too young to talk). New Zealand Sign Language was known by 0.5%. The percentage of people born overseas was 30.6, compared with 28.8% nationally.

Religious affiliations were 32.6% Christian, 5.5% Hindu, 1.7% Islam, 0.8% Māori religious beliefs, 1.9% Buddhist, 0.2% New Age, 0.1% Jewish, and 1.6% other religions. People who answered that they had no religion were 50.3%, and 5.5% of people did not answer the census question.

Of those at least 15 years old, 1,641 (36.2%) people had a bachelor's or higher degree, 2,010 (44.3%) had a post-high school certificate or diploma, and 885 (19.5%) people exclusively held high school qualifications. The median income was $51,300, compared with $41,500 nationally. 930 people (20.5%) earned over $100,000 compared to 12.1% nationally. The employment status of those at least 15 was 2,538 (56.0%) full-time, 567 (12.5%) part-time, and 117 (2.6%) unemployed.

Individual statistical areas
Name	Area (km^{2})	Population	Density (per km^{2})	Dwellings	Median age	Median income
Waterloo West	0.73	2,397	3,284	900	38.8 years	$51,000
Waterloo East	1.08	3,111	2,881	1,185	40.5 years	$51,600
New Zealand					38.1 years	$41,500

== Education ==
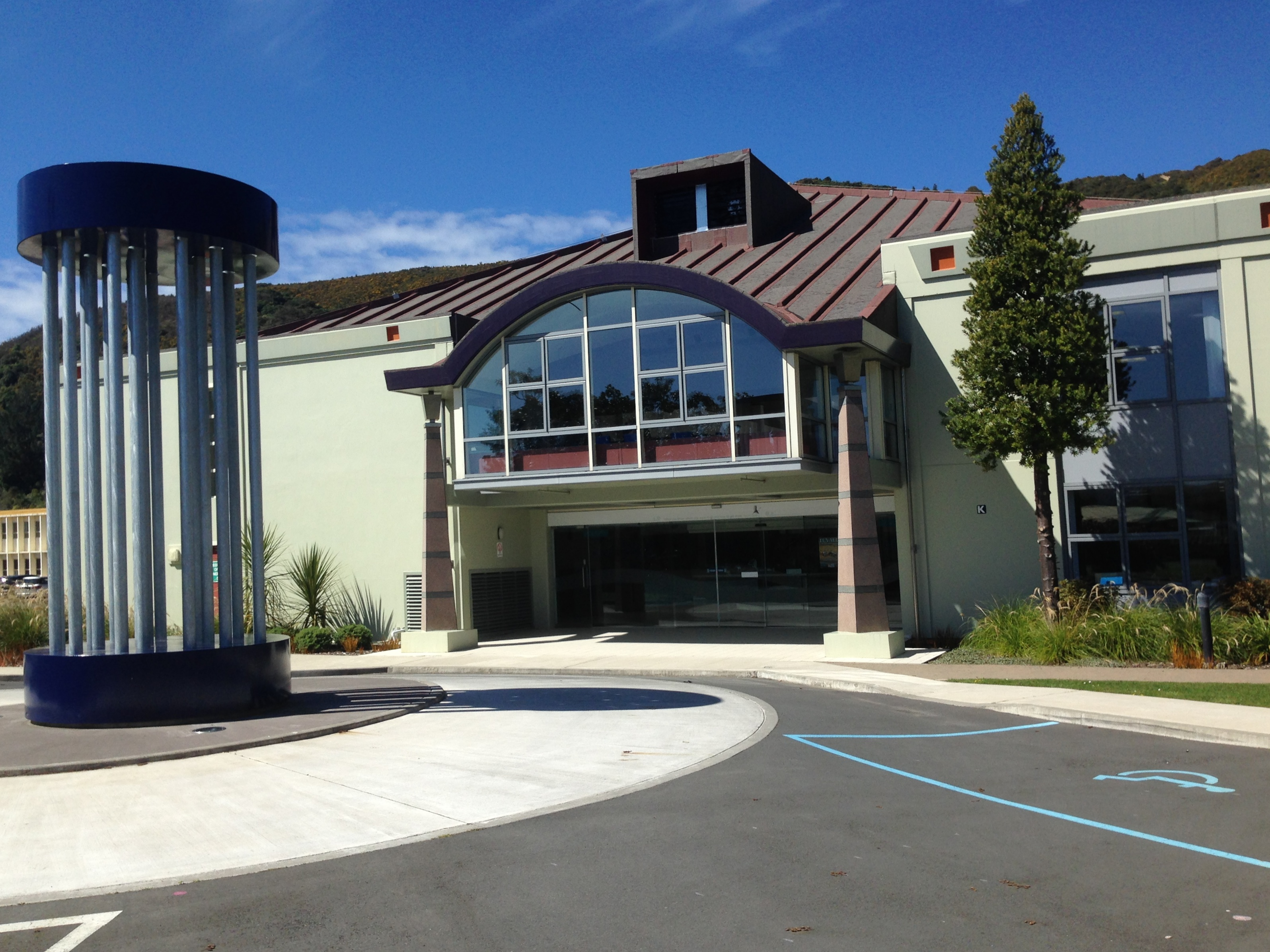
Open Polytechnic

Waterloo School is a co-educational state primary school for Year 1 to 6 students, with a roll of 512 as of July 2026. It opened in 1938.

The Open Polytechnic of New Zealand is in Waterloo.

== Waiwhetū Stream ==
The Waiwhetū Stream is a small watercourse that flows through Waterloo and drains the eastern side of the Hutt Valley. It enters Wellington Harbour at the Hutt River estuary. Development and urbanisation of the Hutt Valley since the arrival of settlers led to increasing pollution and degradation of the stream environment. The stream was diverted into concrete culverts in many sections in an attempt to reduce flooding. Industrial development in the area around the lower reaches of the stream led to that section becoming an industrial sewer. In 2010, the stream was described as one of the most polluted waterways in New Zealand.

Pressure from the community beginning around 2003 helped to trigger a major project to clean up the lower reaches. This project was declared complete in June 2010, after the removal of 56,000 tonnes of toxic waste. In 2010-11, a community group was formed to lead restoration of the upper reaches of the stream. Over a period of 10 years, volunteers cleared invasive aquatic weeds and rubbish from 6 kilometres (3.7 mi) of the stream bed and established around 34,000 locally sourced native plants on the banks of the stream.

== Infrastructure ==
=== Railway station ===
Waterloo railway station (previously known as Waterloo Interchange or Hutt Central) is a dual-platform suburban railway station serving the suburbs of Waterloo, Lower Hutt Central and Woburn. The station is on the Hutt Valley section of the Wairarapa Line, 15.5 km (9.6 mi) north of Wellington. Waterloo serves as a major bus-rail interchange, connecting buses to and from central Lower Hutt, Naenae and Wainuiomata with trains to and from Wellington.

=== Water treatment plant ===
A large water treatment plant is located alongside the Waterloo Railway Station. The water treatment plant is a significant part of the water supply in the Wellington Region, and draws water from the Waiwhetu aquifer via a bore field of eight wells.
