= James Udy =

Reverend James Stuart Udy (30 September 1920 – 24 February 2003) was an Australian Uniting Church minister, Master of Wesley College, University of Sydney, author and President of the World Methodist Historical Society from 1977 until 1983.

== Early life and education ==
Jim Udy was a Methodist minister, and one of three brothers who became ministers of religion. Gloster Udy was his older brother, and Richard Udy was his younger brother. James attended Newington College (1930), North Sydney Boys High School, Maitland High School, University of Sydney and took a PhD at Boston University. James married Anne Benua after meeting on a European bike tour that he took and together they had six children.

== Military chaplain ==
Udy offered himself for service as a chaplain immediately after his ordination at Melbourne in January 1945. After his arrival on the island of Morotai with an engineer unit, he organised the construction of a chapel, which was dedicated on 25 July. Shortly afterwards, Udy was posted to 2/26 Supply Depot Company on the island of Labuan, where, after the Japanese surrender, another chapel (built to the same plans as the first) was constructed by 2/14 Works Unit. During this period, Chaplain Udy worked extensively with repatriated Prisoners of War, and with their Japanese former captors.

== Publications ==
- "Attitudes within the Protestant churches of the Occident towards the propagation of Christianity in the Orient: an historical survey to 1914" (PhD. Dissertation. Boston University, 1952) online copy
- Paul: A Conflux of Streams (Syd, 1956)
- Campus Marks of Christian Presence (Syd, 1968)
- Living Stones (Syd, 1974)
- Dig or Die (Syd, 1980)
- Christians and Churches in Socialist Countries (Syd, 1982)
- Church Union in Australia (Syd, 1983)
- A Pride of Lions (Syd, 1990)
- One More Challenge (Syd, 2001)
