= Gloster Udy =

Gloster Stuart Udy (21 May 1918 – 4 May 2003) was an Australian Uniting Church minister and author.

== Early life and education ==
Udy was the eldest son of Joseph George Stuart Udy (1885–1959) a Cornish Methodist minister and was one of three brothers who became ministers of religion. James Udy and Richard Udy were his younger brothers. Udy attended Newington College (1933), North Sydney Boys High School and Maitland High School. He studied Arts at the University of Sydney graduating in 1939.

== War service ==
Udy served during the Second World War as a sergeant and then captain and chaplain to the 2/23 Infantry Battalion. He was at the battle for Tarakan.

== Christian mission ==
In 1951 he took up a posting as Minister of the Leigh Memorial Church at Parramatta. Udy was a Director of Lifeline and during his career served on the staff of the General Board of the Methodist Department of Evangelism in Nashville. After his retirement in 1988 he promoted the restoration of the Castlereagh Methodist Church which is the site of the first Methodist chapel in Australia. He is buried in the grounds.

== Publications ==
Udy published seven books of history, religion and biography.

== Honours ==
- 1980 – Member of the Order of the British Empire (Civil) for service to the community
- 2003 – Medal of the Order of Australia (Civil) for service to the community, particularly through Lifeline and the Parramatta Regional Methodist Mission – 2003
- 2006 – Gloster Udy Memorial Hall at the Castlereagh Academy opened by Her Excellency Professor The Honourable Marie Bashir AC CVO
