= Hart Udy =

- Born: Hart Udy; 27 July 1857 Greytown, New Zealand
- Died: 6 August 1933 (aged 76) Napier, New Zealand
- Weight: 82 kg (181 lb)
- School: Greytown High School
- Notable relative: Dan Udy (cousin)
- Occupation(s): Blacksmith and wheelwright

Rugby union career
- Position: Forward
Provincial / State sides
Years	Team	Apps	(Points)
1882–84	Wellington		
International career
Years	Team	Apps	(Points)
1884	New Zealand	0	(0)

Hart Udy (27 July 1857 – 6 August 1933) was a New Zealand rugby union player. A forward, Udy represented Wellington at a provincial level, and was a member of the first ever New Zealand national side, which toured Australia and won every game, in 1884. He played eight matches on the tour. He did not play any full test matches as New Zealand did not play their first until 1903. He was the Wellington selector from 1884 to 1885.

A cousin, Dan Udy, represented New Zealand in 1901 and 1903.
