= Giles Udy =

English writer and historian

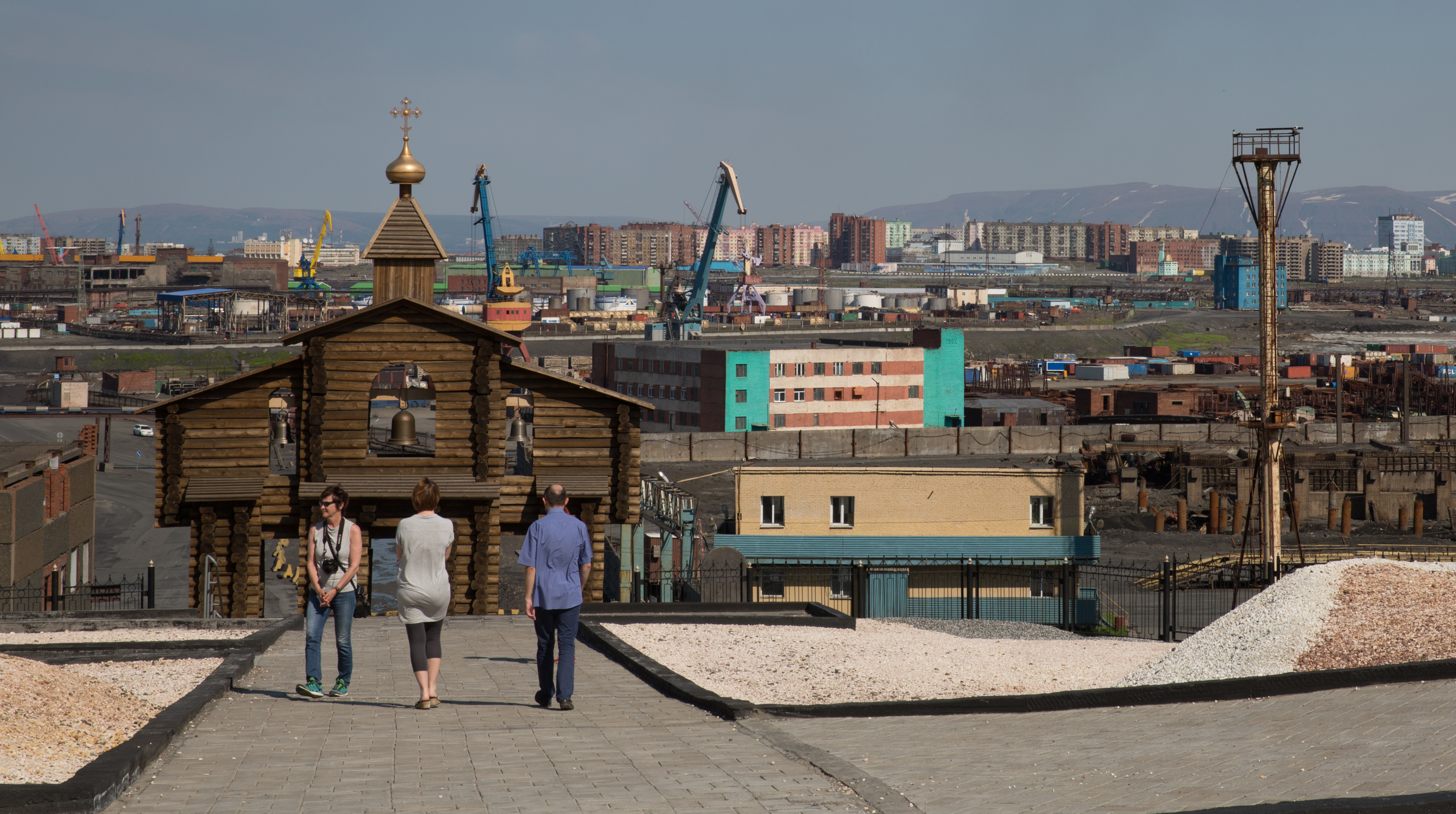
Monument to the victims of the Norilsk gulag

Giles William Udy (born February 1956) is an English writer and historian of the Soviet Gulag system. He is a member of the council of the Keston Institute and holds an MBA from the Cass Business School. He is a regular contributor to The Times, The Daily Telegraph, the Daily Mail, the i, UnHerd and the magazine Standpoint.

Udy has made a long-term study of the history of the gulag camps of Norilsk, his collection of photographs of which is in the Hoover Institution Archives. His book Labour and the Gulag (2017) examines the response of the British labour movement to conditions under Stalinism and developed from his earlier Gulag studies after he discovered that the British labour movement had suppressed criticism of conditions in the camps.

== Selected publications ==
- "For slaves: against Labour", Church Times, No. 7829, 5 April 2013, pp. 17–18.
- "The Christian Protest Movement, the Labour Government and Soviet Religious Repression, 1929–1931", The Journal of Ecclesiastical History, Vol. 66, Issue 1 (January 2015), pp. 116–139.
- Labour and the Gulag: Russia and the Seduction of the British Left. Biteback, 2017. ISBN 978-1785902048
