= Hutt Intermediate School =

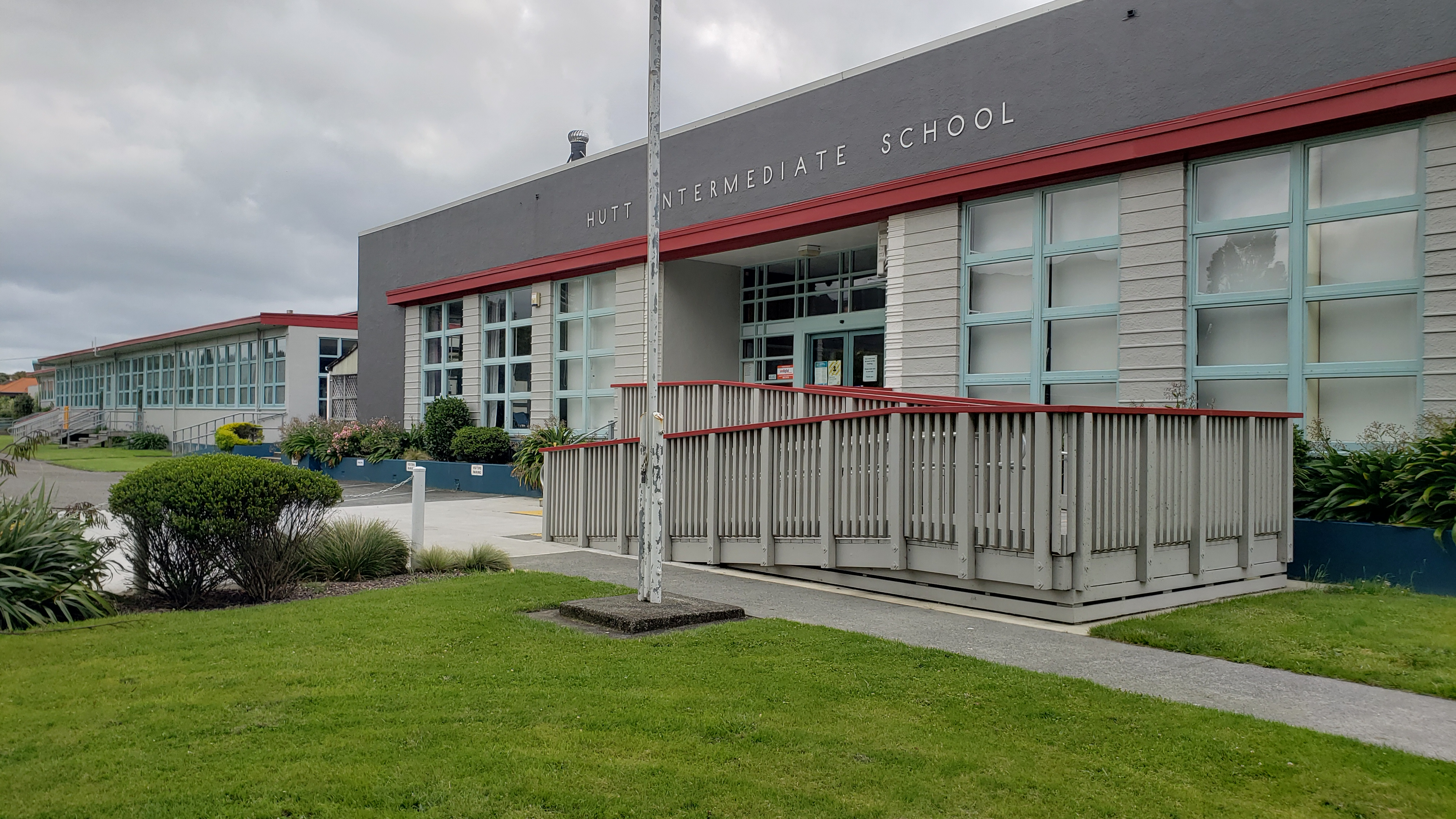

Location
- Kauri Street; Woburn; Lower Hutt 5011; New Zealand; 41.2153°S 174.9134°E

Information
- Type: State Intermediate, not integrated, co-ed
- Motto: 'Kia Maia' (Stand Tall)
- Established: 1948
- Ministry of Education Institution no.: 2863
- Principal: Mike Gillatt
- Enrolment: 604 (July 2026)
- Socio-economic decile: 8
- Website: huttintermediate.school.nz

Hutt Intermediate School (HIS) is a state intermediate school located in Lower Hutt, New Zealand. The school was founded in 1948, and currently has a total number of 685 students and a teaching staff of 45.

The principal, until the end of 2006, was Neil Withington. He was the principal of Hutt Intermediate School for six years, and has left to take up a position at Victoria University of Wellington. Mike Gillatt has taken up the position since.

== Enrolment ==
As of July 2026, Hutt Intermediate School has a roll of 604 students, of which 94 (15.6%) identify as Māori.

As of 2026, the school has an Equity Index of 412, placing it amongst schools whose students have few socioeconomic barriers to achievement (roughly equivalent to deciles 8 and 9 under the former socio-economic decile system).

== Houses ==
The four houses in the school (in alphabetical order) are Bracken (green), Brooke (blue), Burns (white) and Byron (red), named after British poets. The houses compete fiercely to win the House Cup, awarded at the end of every school year.

Every student and member of staff in the school, other than the principal and deputy principals, subscribes to one of these houses.

It is often the case that families will align themselves to certain houses, such as where the oldest sibling of a family was in Burns, their younger siblings, children and grandchildren who attend the school will also be in Burns. The School song is sung at every school assembly with all up standing.

== Notable alumni ==
- Chris Bishop (born 1983), politician
- Chris Hipkins, former NZ Prime Minister, politician
- Jason O'Halloran, rugby player
- Anna Paquin, actress
- Holly Walker (born 1982), politician
- Nick Willis, Olympic athlete
