= Fairfield, Lower Hutt =

Fairfield
- Suburb
- Interactive map of Fairfield
- Coordinates: 41.2127°S 174.9371°E
- Country: New Zealand
- City: Lower Hutt City
- Electoral ward: Central Ward

Population (2006) approx.
  - Total: 2,976

	Avalon	Naenae
Epuni	Fairfield
Waterloo	Arakura

Fairfield is an eastern suburb of Lower Hutt, in the Wellington Region of New Zealand.

== Demographics ==
Fairfield is included in the demographics for Epuni East.

== Education ==
Te Puni School is a co-educational state primary school for Year 1 to 6 students, with a roll of 156 as of July 2026. The school was previously known as Epuni School until October 2025. See photo of Epuni School, 1970s

== Community ==
The Common Unity Project Aotearoa located at 310 Waiwhetu Road was founded in 2012 by Julia Milne based on a philosophy of strengthening the community through collaboration.

== Epuni Boys Home ==
Epuni Boys Home was opened on 29 January 1959 at 441 Riverside Drive as a state-run home for "troubled" boys aged between eight and 17. It closed in February 1990. Numerous allegations of physical and sexual abuse have been made by former residents during their time at the Home and these were among allegations examined by the Royal Commission of Enquiry into State Care.

== Waiwhetū Stream ==
The Waiwhetū Stream is a small watercourse that flows through Fairfield and drains the eastern side of the Hutt Valley. It enters Wellington Harbour at the Hutt River estuary. Development and urbanisation of the Hutt Valley since the arrival of settlers led to increasing pollution and degradation of the stream environment. The stream was diverted into concrete culverts in many sections in an attempt to reduce flooding. Industrial development in the area around the lower reaches of the stream led to that section becoming an industrial sewer. In 2010, the stream was described as one of the most polluted waterways in New Zealand.

Pressure from the community beginning around 2003 helped to trigger a major project to clean up the lower reaches. This project was declared complete in June 2010, after the removal of 56,000 tonnes of toxic waste. In 2010–11, a community group was formed to lead restoration of the upper reaches of the stream. Over a period of 10 years, volunteers cleared invasive aquatic weeds and rubbish from 6 kilometres (3.7 mi) of the stream bed and established around 34,000 locally sourced native plants on the banks of the stream.

== Flock mill ==
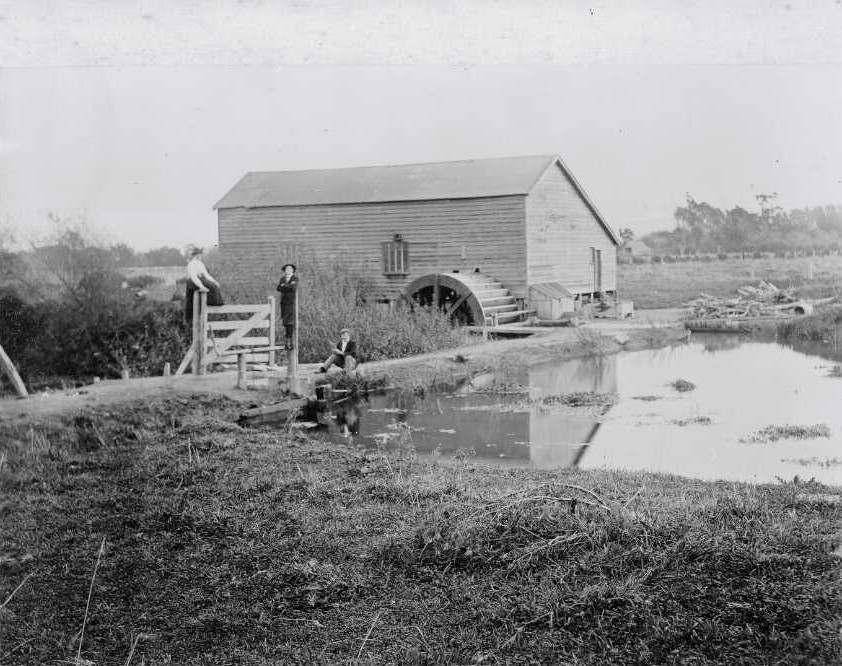
The flock mill with water wheel prior to the 1901 fire

A flock mill was established in 1898 in Fairfield, adjacent to the Waiwhetū Stream at the intersection of what is now Rumgay Street and Riverside Drive. It used a weir in the stream and a breastshot water wheel as a source of mechanical power. The flock mill operated for around 50 years, but was the subject of litigation in 1909-1910 that was heard in the Supreme Court over the effects of the flooding caused by the construction of the weir in the stream.

== Notable residents ==
- Montague Ongley
