= Woburn, New Zealand =

Suburb of Lower Hutt, New Zealand

Woburn
- Suburb
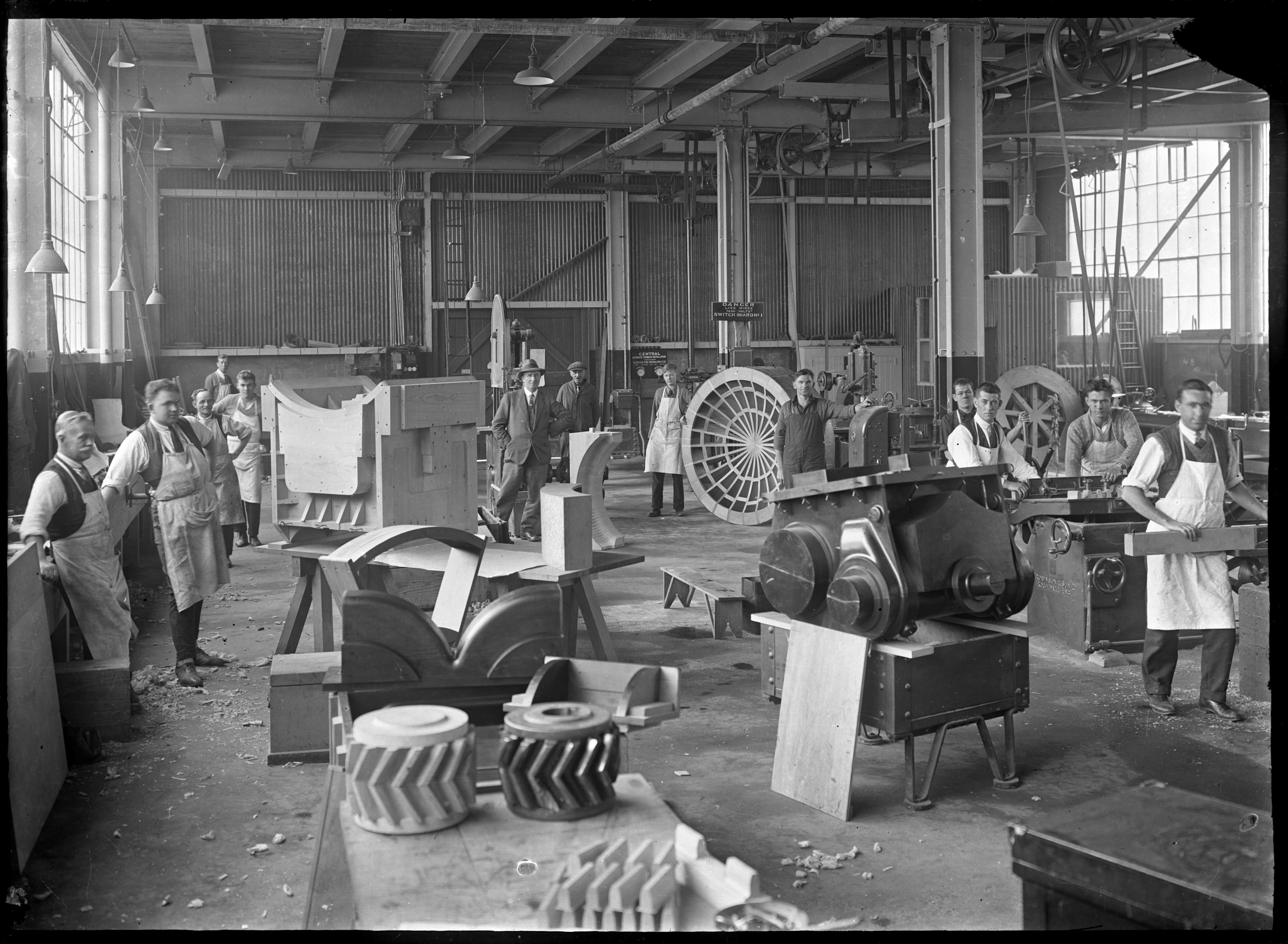
- Hutt Railway Workshops pattern shop in 1930
- Interactive map of Woburn
- Coordinates: 41°13′S 174°54′E
- Country: New Zealand
- City: Lower Hutt
- Local authority: Hutt City Council
- Electoral ward: Central / Harbour
- Established: 1840s

Area
  - Land: 0.62 ha (1.5 acres)

Population (June 2025)
  - Total: 1,830
  - Density: 300,000/km^{2} (760,000/sq mi)
- Train stations: Woburn railway station

	Hutt Central	Waterloo
	Woburn	Waiwhetū
Ava	Moera

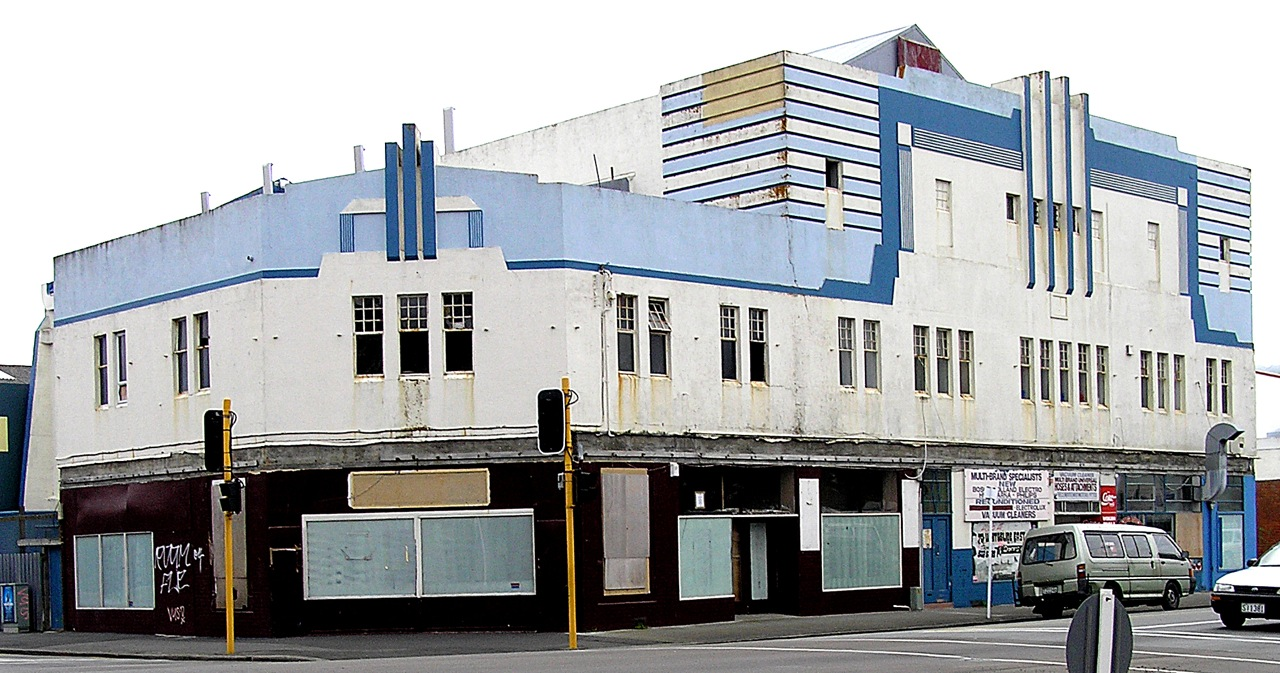
The Prince Edward Cinema, since demolished

Woburn is a suburb of Lower Hutt, Wellington situated at the bottom of the North Island of New Zealand.

Henry Petre farmed the area in the 1840s and named the area after the Duke of Bedford's estate, Woburn Abbey. Petre's farm was later taken over by Daniel and Harriet Riddiford, whose descendants built a large home there, with the land being gradually subdivided. Riddiford Street in Lower Hutt commemorates them.

== Demographics ==
Woburn statistical area covers 0.62 km^{2} (0.24 sq mi). It had an estimated population of 1,830 as of June 2025, with a population density of 2,952 people per km^{2}.

Historical population
Year	Pop.	±% p.a.
2006	1,734	—
2013	1,692	−0.35%
2018	1,752	+0.70%
2023	1,731	−0.24%

Woburn had a population of 1,731 in the 2023 New Zealand census, a decrease of 21 people (−1.2%) since the 2018 census, and an increase of 39 people (2.3%) since the 2013 census. There were 861 males, 870 females, and 3 people of other genders in 654 dwellings. 3.5% of people identified as LGBTIQ+. The median age was 43.2 years (compared with 38.1 years nationally). There were 291 people (16.8%) aged under 15 years, 273 (15.8%) aged 15 to 29, 819 (47.3%) aged 30 to 64, and 348 (20.1%) aged 65 or older.

People could identify as more than one ethnicity. The results were 69.0% European (Pākehā); 10.4% Māori; 3.6% Pasifika; 25.8% Asian; 1.7% Middle Eastern, Latin American and African New Zealanders (MELAA); and 1.4% other, which includes people giving their ethnicity as "New Zealander". English was spoken by 95.3%, Māori by 2.3%, Samoan by 1.0%, and other languages by 23.4%. No language could be spoken by 1.2% (e.g. too young to talk). New Zealand Sign Language was known by 0.3%. The percentage of people born overseas was 33.6, compared with 28.8% nationally.

Religious affiliations were 33.8% Christian, 5.7% Hindu, 0.9% Islam, 0.3% Māori religious beliefs, 1.9% Buddhist, 0.2% Jewish, and 1.4% other religions. People who answered that they had no religion were 50.8%, and 5.4% of people did not answer the census question.

Of those at least 15 years old, 558 (38.8%) people had a bachelor's or higher degree, 594 (41.2%) had a post-high school certificate or diploma, and 285 (19.8%) people exclusively held high school qualifications. The median income was $51,300, compared with $41,500 nationally. 336 people (23.3%) earned over $100,000 compared to 12.1% nationally. The employment status of those at least 15 was 771 (53.5%) full-time, 177 (12.3%) part-time, and 36 (2.5%) unemployed.
