= Wingate railway station =

Railway station in New Zealand

Wingate
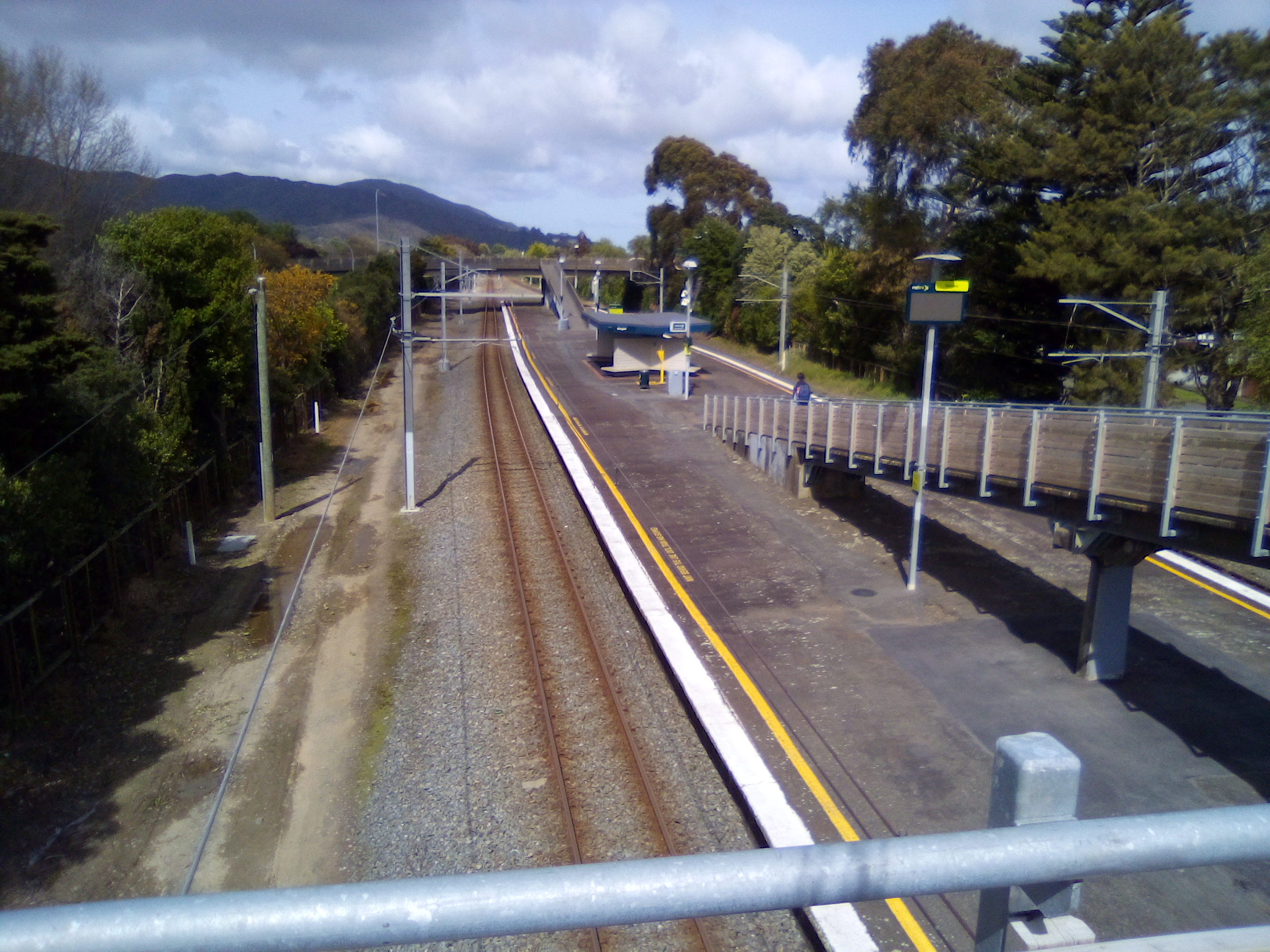
- Wingate station in 2021

General information
- Location: Wingate Crescent, Taitā, Lower Hutt, New Zealand
- Coordinates: 41°11.321′S 174°57.279′E
- System: Metlink suburban rail
- Owner: Greater Wellington Regional Council
- Line: Wairarapa Line
- Platforms: Island
- Tracks: Main line (2)

Construction
- Parking: Yes

Other information
- Station code: WING
- Fare zone: 5

History
- Opened: 25 September 1950; 76 years ago
- Electrified: 14 September 1953; 73 years ago

Services
Preceding station	Transdev Wellington	Following station
Taitā towards Upper Hutt	Hutt Valley Line	Naenae towards Wellington
Location

Wingate railway station is a suburban railway station in Lower Hutt, New Zealand, serving the Wingate industrial area and parts of Avalon, New Zealand, Naenae and Taitā suburbs. The station is located on the Hutt Valley section of the Wairarapa Line, 19.5 km (12.1 mi) north of Wellington. The station is served by Metlink's electric multiple unit trains of the "Matangi" FP class. Trains stopping at Wingate run to Wellington, Taitā and Upper Hutt.

The station has an island platform station between double tracks, linked via ramp south to the Wingate Overbridge and via an overbridge north to Rainey Grove (west) and Wingate Crescent (east).

== History ==
The then Hutt Valley Branch to Waterloo opened on 26 May 1927. The branch line was extended to Epuni and Naenae on 7 January 1946 and to Taitā (then known as Taita) on 14 April 1947. Double track was to Naenae only.

The Wingate Station was opened on 25 September 1950. Double track was extended to Wingate and Taitā on 22 February 1953. With the opening of the section to Haywards (now called Manor Park) from 1 March 1954 and the closing of the Melling-Haywards section, this route became the main route to Upper Hutt and the Wairarapa.

== Services ==
The following Metlink bus routes serve Wingate station:

Previous timetabled stop	Metlink Bus Services	Next timetabled stop
Taitā Station towards Stokes Valley	121; Valley Heights	Naenae (Kowhai Street) towards Gracefield
