= Epuni railway station =

Railway station in New Zealand

Epuni
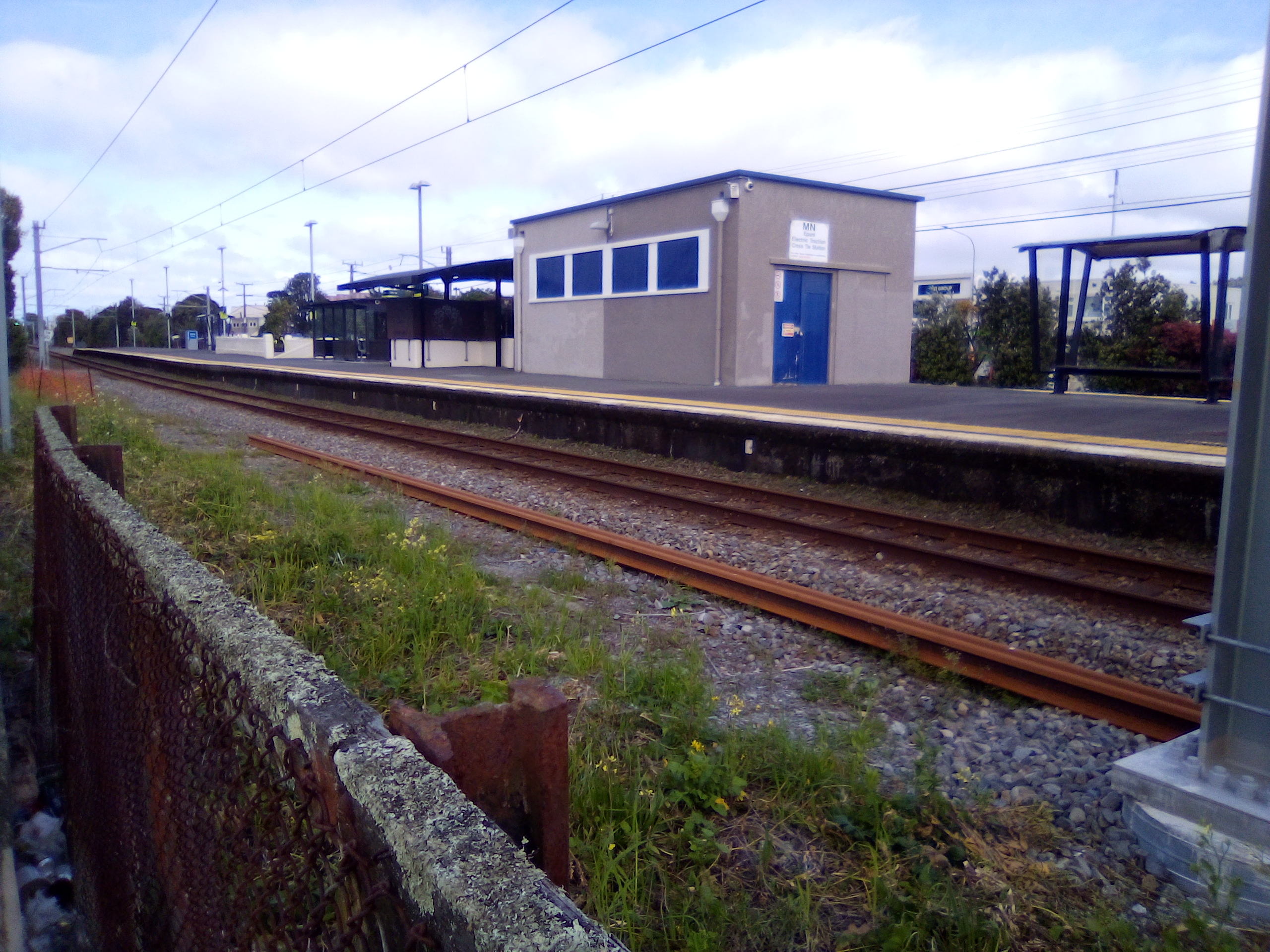
- Epuni station in 2021

General information
- Location: Oxford Terrace, Epuni, Lower Hutt, New Zealand
- Coordinates: 41°12.458′S 174°55.809′E
- System: Metlink suburban rail
- Owner: Greater Wellington Regional Council
- Line: Hutt Valley Line
- Platforms: Island
- Tracks: Main line (2)

Construction
- Parking: Yes, Western Side Only
- Cycle facilities: No

Other information
- Station code: EPUN
- Fare zone: 5

History
- Opened: 7 January 1946; 80 years ago
- Rebuilt: June 2008 to June 2009; 17 years ago
- Electrified: 12 September 1953

Services
Preceding station	Transdev Wellington	Following station
Naenae towards Upper Hutt	Hutt Valley Line	Waterloo towards Wellington
Location

Epuni railway station is a suburban railway station serving Epuni and Fairfield in Lower Hutt, New Zealand. The station is located on the Hutt Valley section of the Wairarapa Line, 16.5 km (10.3 mi) north of Wellington. The station is served by Metlink's electric multiple unit trains of the "Matangi" FP class. Trains stopping at Epuni run to Wellington, Taitā and Upper Hutt.

The station has an island platform between double tracks, which linked via a pedestrian subway to Cambridge Terrace and Fairfield in the east, and to Oxford Terrace and Epuni in the west.

== History ==
Epuni station opened on 7 January 1946, as part of the extension of the then Hutt Valley Branch line from Waterloo to Naenae. The line through Epuni was initially single track; the second track opened fifteen months later in April 1947.

The line through Epuni was electrified at 1500 V DC in September 1953. As part of the works, a "cross-tie" traction substation was built on the Epuni platform; this substation did not feed power into the overhead lines but provided a switching point halfway between the two feeder traction substations at Petone and Pomare.

In March 1954, the Wairarapa Line was diverted onto the Hutt Valley Branch, putting Epuni on the mainline between Wellington and Upper Hutt.

=== 2008 - 2009 rebuild ===
The station was closed temporarily on 15 May 2008 due to the possible presence of asbestos. TranzMetro subsequently announced that they would replace the original station with a glass shelter and improved lighting. The station reopened on Tuesday 12 August 2008 with limited shelter area.

On Good Friday 10 April 2009, the wooden section of the original station building was demolished leaving on the concrete Cross-Tie Electric Traction equipment building and subway entrances remaining. Over the course of the Easter weekend two small glass shelters were installed at each end of the station. Tranz Metro also announced that a third larger shelter will be installed on the site of the original station building. The station was closed from 15 August 2009 to June 2009 for what was called development work on the platform.

In 2019, automatic pedestrian gates which lock shut were installed as some pedestrians and cyclists ignore the flashing lights on the adjacent level crossing.

== Services ==
The following Metlink bus routes serve Epuni station:

Previous timetabled stop	Metlink Bus Services	Next timetabled stop
Naenae College (Daysh St) towards Kelson	150; Western Hills	Waterloo Station towards Petone
