= Naenae railway station =

Railway station in New Zealand

Naenae
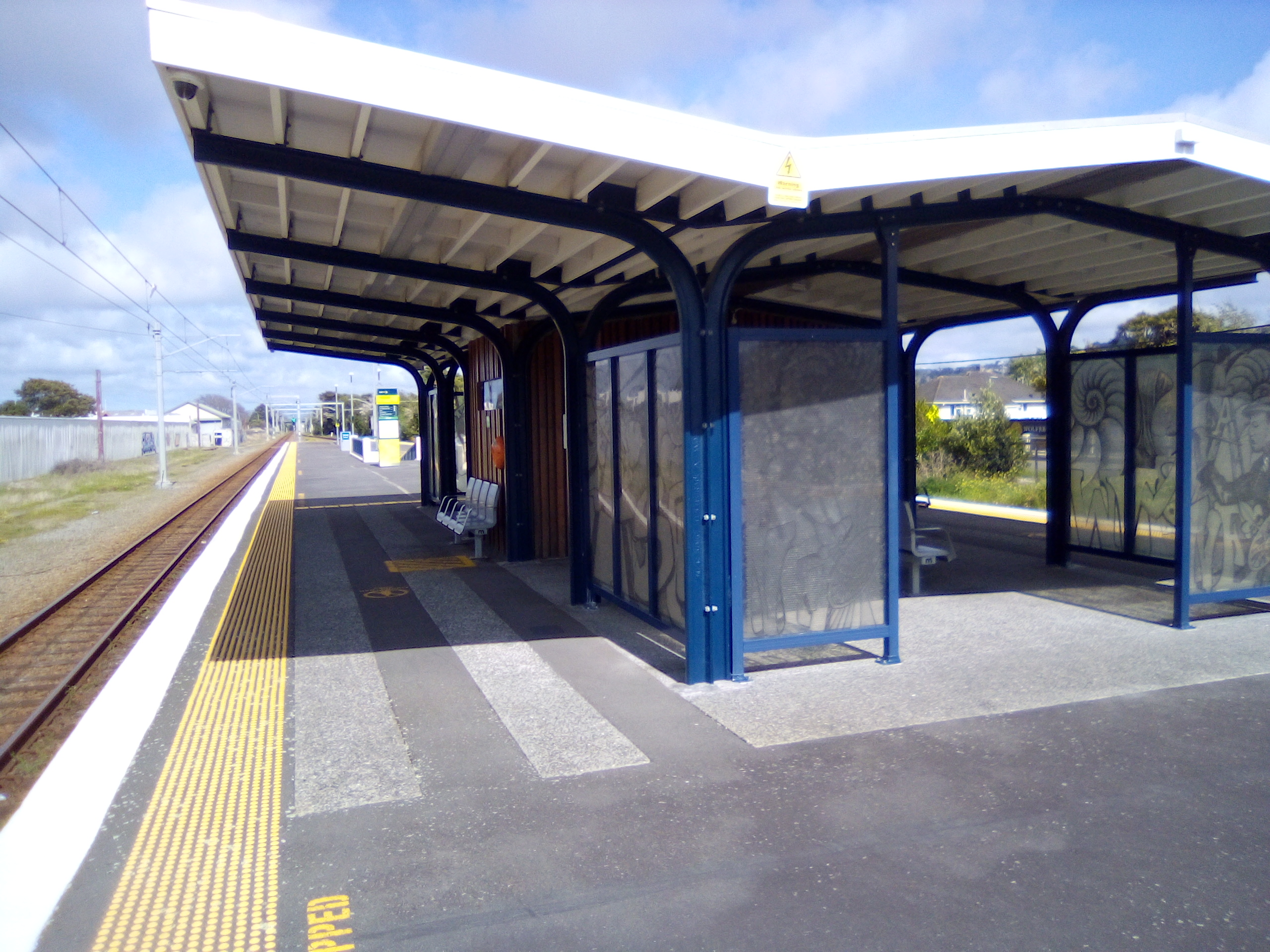
- Naenae station in 2021

General information
- Location: Cambridge Terrace, Naenae, Lower Hutt, New Zealand
- Coordinates: 41°11.876′S 174°56.754′E
- System: Metlink suburban rail
- Owner: Greater Wellington Regional Council
- Line: Wairarapa Line
- Platforms: Island
- Tracks: Main line (2)

Construction
- Parking: Yes

Other information
- Station code: NAEN
- Fare zone: 5

History
- Opened: 7 January 1946; 80 years ago
- Electrified: 14 September 1953; 73 years ago

Services
Preceding station	Transdev Wellington	Following station
Wingate towards Upper Hutt	Hutt Valley Line	Epuni towards Wellington
Location

Naenae railway station is a suburban railway station serving Naenae and Avalon in Lower Hutt, New Zealand. The station is located on the Hutt Valley section of the Wairarapa Line, 18.3 km (11.4 mi) north of Wellington. The station is served by Metlink's electric multiple unit trains of the "Matangi" FP class. Trains stopping at Naenae run to Wellington, Taitā and Upper Hutt.

The station has an island platform between double tracks, linked via a pedestrian subway to Cambridge Terrace and the Naenae shopping centre in the east and Oxford Terrace and Avalon in the west.

== History ==
Naenae station opened on 7 January 1946 when a single line of the then Hutt Valley Branch was extended from Waterloo to Naenae. The station served as the branch's terminus until the extension to Taitā (then known as Taita) opened fifteen months later in April 1947; at the same time the line south of Naenae was double-tracked. Double track north of the station to Taitā opened in February 1953, and the line through Naenae was electrified on 12 September 1953. In March 1954, Naenae became part of the main Wairarapa Line when the Taitā to Haywards (now Manor Park) extension opened and the existing Melling to Haywards line closed.

Naenae Station closed from 14 May 2012 to allow a rebuild of the station to take place. The rebuild included a new platform shelter, resurfacing of the platform itself and renovation of the subway connecting the platform to Cambridge and Oxford Terraces. A shuttle bus service was provided between Naenae and Waterloo Station on weekdays during peak times. The station reopened on 27 August 2012.

In 2023-4, the Naenae station subway was given a makeover with fresh render/waterproof/paint, lights, CCTV, public announcement system, entry canopies and cultural designs by Len Hetet.

== Services ==
Transdev Wellington, on behalf of the Greater Wellington Regional Council, operates Hutt Valley Line electric suburban services under the "Metlink" brand between Wellington and Upper Hutt via Naenae. The basic daytime off-peak timetable is:

- 2 trains per hour (tph) to Wellington, stopping all stations.
- 2 tph to Upper Hutt, stopping all stations.

Metlink bus routes 121 and 130 serve Naenae station.
