= Pomare, Lower Hutt =

Suburb of Lower Hutt, New Zealand

Pomare
- Suburb
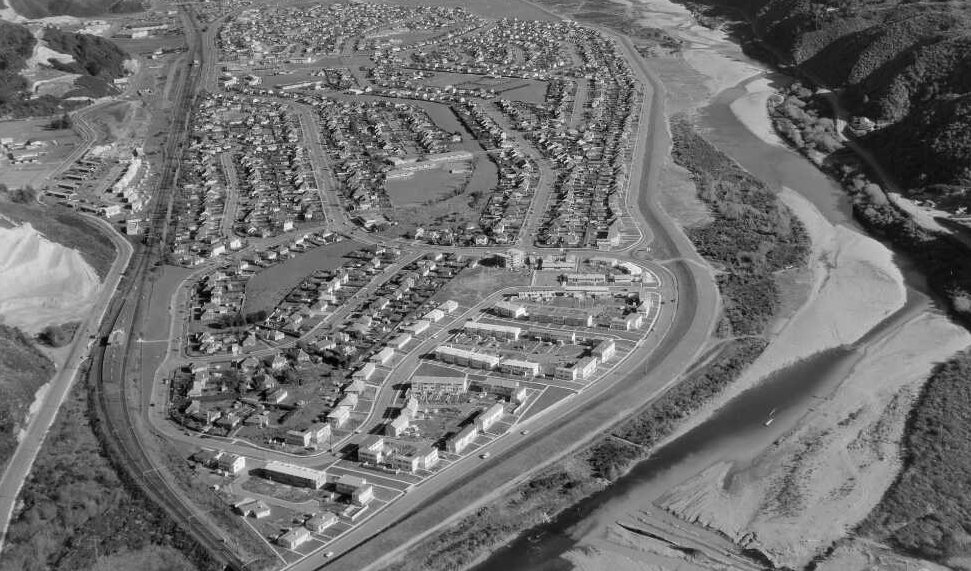
- Aerial view of Pomare from the north in 1963
- Interactive map of Pomare
- Coordinates: 41.170°S 174.966°E
- Country: New Zealand
- City: Lower Hutt
- Local authority: Hutt City Council
- Electoral ward: Northern
- Train stations: Pomare Railway Station

		Manor Park
	Pomare	Stokes Valley
Taitā	Taitā

Pomare is a residential neighbourhood of Lower Hutt, in the Wellington Region of New Zealand's North Island. It comprises the northern part of the suburb of Taitā, and includes the Pomare Railway Station and Pomare School.

The suburb is named after either Māui Pōmare (Ngāti Mutunga), who served as Minister of Health from 1923 to 1926, or an early Māori chief in the area. Pomare Railway Station opened in 1954. State housing in the area has been redeveloped by Housing New Zealand since 2011 after years of social neglect and gang problems.

== Education ==
There is one primary school in the area. Pomare School is a state contributing primary (years 1 to 6) school with 89 students as of October 2025. It opened in 1948.
