= Christ Church, Taita =

Christ Church
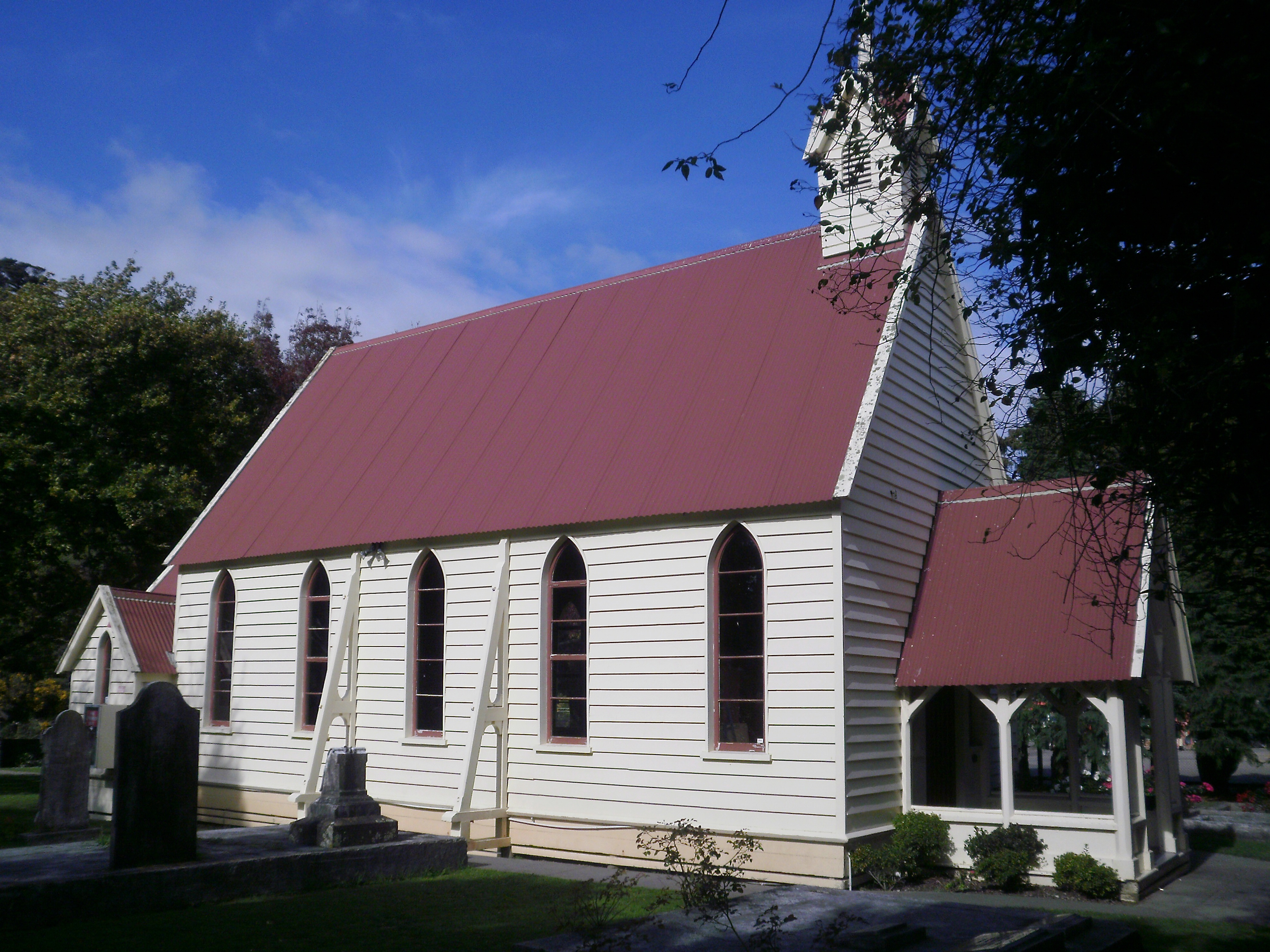
- Christ Church, Taitā
- Christ Church
- 41°10′56″S 174°57′38″E
- Address: 73 Eastern Hutt Road, Taitā, Lower Hutt, Wellington region, North Island
- Country: New Zealand
- Denomination: Anglican
- Website: christ-church.org.nz

History
- Status: Church
- Consecrated: 1 January 1854

Architecture
- Functional status: Active
- Architect: Octavius Bousfield
- Architectural type: Church
- Style: Gothic Revival
- Years built: 1853

Specifications
- Materials: Timber

Administration
- Province: Anglican Church in Aotearoa, New Zealand and Polynesia
- Diocese: Wellington
- Parish: St Matthew's, Taitā

Heritage New Zealand – Category 1
- Official name: Christ Church (Anglican)
- Designated: 21 September 1989
- Reference no.: 1325

Christ Church is a heritage-listed Anglican church located in Taitā, Lower Hutt in the Wellington region of New Zealand. The church is the oldest surviving church in the Wellington region.

== History ==
The church is built on land donated by Algernon Grey Tollemache. Sidney Hirst, a Yorkshire-born carpenter, constructed the building, completing it in late 1853. The timber was donated by John Ings Daysh. The timber church has significant technical interest in that the method of its original construction did not require nails.

In the 1950s, efforts to protect the church played a role in the establishment of the New Zealand Historic Places Trust.

An arsonist destroyed about a third of the interior of the building in 1989, but it has since been restored from photos and architectural drawings.
