= Kelson, New Zealand =

Suburb of Lower Hutt, New Zealand

Kelson
- Suburb
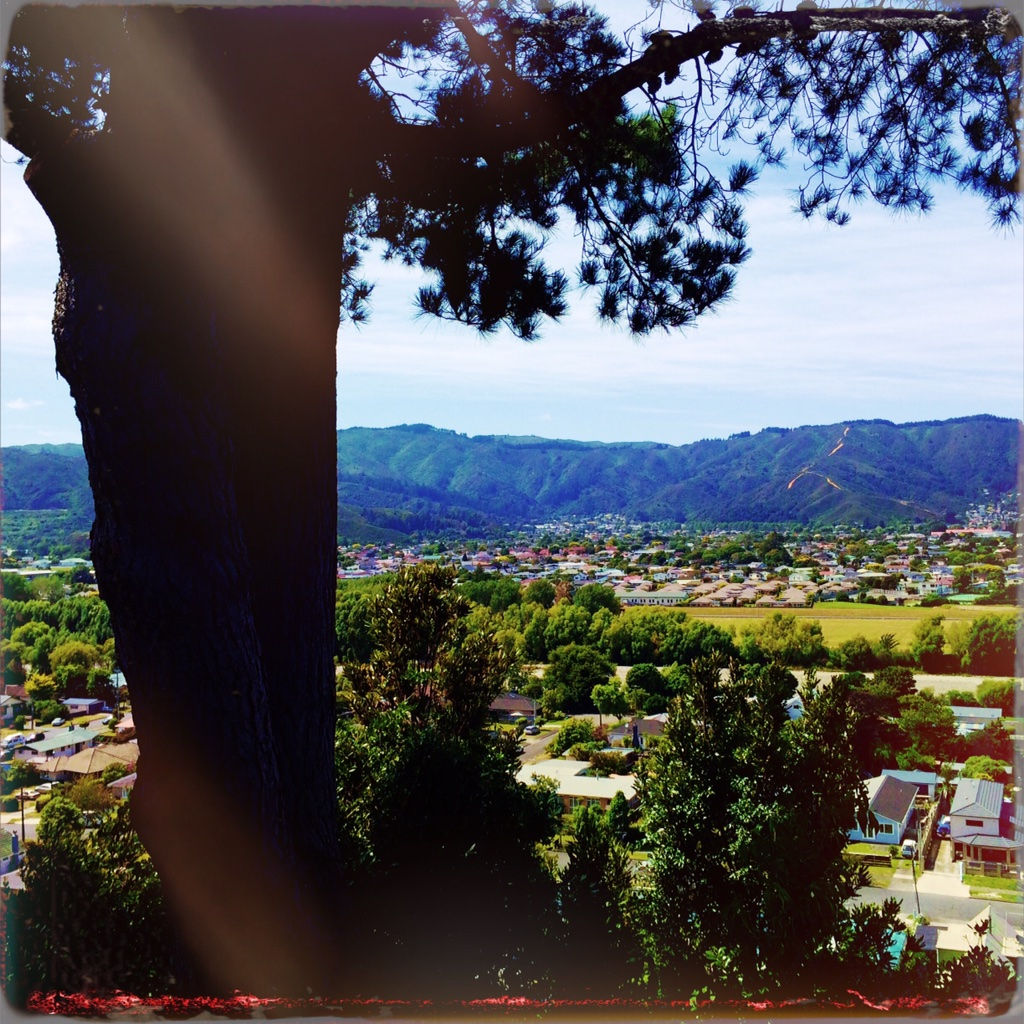
- View of the Hutt Valley from Kelson
- Interactive map of Kelson
- Coordinates: 41°10′46″S 174°55′57″E
- Country: New Zealand
- City: Hutt City
- Local authority: Hutt City Council
- Electoral ward: Western
- Established: 1960s

Area
  - Land: 536 ha (1,320 acres)

Population (June 2025)
  - Total: 3,130
  - Density: 584/km^{2} (1,510/sq mi)

		Haywards and Manor Park
	Kelson	Taitā
Belmont	Avalon

Kelson is a suburb of Lower Hutt in Wellington, New Zealand. It is situated on the western hills of the Hutt Valley. To the west of the suburb lies the Belmont Regional Park, while to the east runs the Hutt River and State Highway 2.

== History ==
Kelson takes its name from George Kells, the original settler owner of the land, and from his son Bill who directed the subdivision, hence the name "Kelson". It was advertised in 1961 as "the gateway to a new suburb".

During the 1960s, the lower parts of Kelson were built on. Residential development did not commence on any large scale until about 1973–1974, when approval was given for its boundaries to be extended into the western hills.

The population trebled between 1971 and 1976, making it the fastest-growing suburb in Lower Hutt during that period.

== Geography ==
Kelson forms part of the western hills of the Hutt Valley, with the Hutt River to the east.

The suburb is adjacent to Speedys Reserve/Pareraho Forest, and the wider Belmont Regional Park. Picnic areas, walking and biking tracks in this region are looked after by volunteers from the Pareraho Forest Trust. Pareraho Forest contains lowland forest on hill country, with diverse canopy species including large specimens of Laurelia novae-zelandiae (Pukatea), Tawa, Knightia excelsa (Rewarewa) and Kohekohe. The region is also home to a variety of native bird species, including tūī, pīwakawaka, grey warbler, whitehead, ruru, silvereye and kererū.

== Landmarks ==
Kelson Playground is situated on Taieri Crescent behind Kelson Kindergarten and next to Kelson School. It was opened in May 1976 by John Kennedy-Good, the mayor of Lower Hutt at the time. The original playground was designed and constructed by the Western Hills Lions Club in association with the Belmont Women's Organisation. In February 2021 the playground received an upgrade thanks to a council community partnership between the Kelson School Fundraising Committee and Hutt City Council. It was renamed Pareraho Playground.

Kelson Community Centre is situated on Timaru Grove and run by the Kelson Community Association. After a local family gifted the section to the community, it was built and opened in March 1986 with community-raised funds and council assistance. The centre hosts public meetings, fairs, quiz and bingo evenings, children's birthday parties, fundraisers, corporate functions, engagement parties, church groups, theatre groups, and a regular playgroup.

Discovery Elim Christian Centre is an Elim Pentecostal Church located on Major Drive. It originated as Kelson Christian Centre, with the first service held at the Kelson Community Centre in November 1996. As the congregation expanded, it moved services to Kelson School. Subsequently, the purpose-built facility currently in use was built and commenced use on 11 February 2007. The name was changed to Discovery Christian Centre, and an adjoining Early Learning Centre was opened in April 2007. A few years later, the church joined the Elim movement, and held their inaugural service as Discovery Elim Christian Centre on 1 May 2011.

== Demographics ==
Kelson statistical area covers 5.36 km^{2} (2.07 sq mi). It had an estimated population of 3,130 as of June 2025, with a population density of 584 people per km^{2}.

Historical population
Year	Pop.	±% p.a.
2006	2,619	—
2013	2,697	+0.42%
2018	2,835	+1.00%
2023	2,898	+0.44%

Kelson had a population of 2,898 in the 2023 New Zealand census, an increase of 63 people (2.2%) since the 2018 census, and an increase of 201 people (7.5%) since the 2013 census. There were 1,404 males, 1,482 females, and 12 people of other genders in 1,047 dwellings. 3.6% of people identified as LGBTIQ+. The median age was 36.8 years (compared with 38.1 years nationally). There were 642 people (22.2%) aged under 15 years, 402 (13.9%) aged 15 to 29, 1,518 (52.4%) aged 30 to 64, and 339 (11.7%) aged 65 or older.

People could identify as more than one ethnicity. The results were 71.9% European (Pākehā); 9.2% Māori; 5.7% Pasifika; 20.9% Asian; 2.4% Middle Eastern, Latin American and African New Zealanders (MELAA); and 2.7% other, which includes people giving their ethnicity as "New Zealander". English was spoken by 95.8%, Māori by 2.3%, Samoan by 1.6%, and other languages by 20.5%. No language could be spoken by 2.7% (e.g. too young to talk). New Zealand Sign Language was known by 0.8%. The percentage of people born overseas was 29.6, compared with 28.8% nationally.

Religious affiliations were 33.6% Christian, 4.6% Hindu, 1.3% Islam, 0.3% Māori religious beliefs, 1.4% Buddhist, 0.5% New Age, 0.2% Jewish, and 2.3% other religions. People who answered that they had no religion were 49.4%, and 6.5% of people did not answer the census question.

Of those at least 15 years old, 828 (36.7%) people had a bachelor's or higher degree, 1,071 (47.5%) had a post-high school certificate or diploma, and 363 (16.1%) people exclusively held high school qualifications. The median income was $62,000, compared with $41,500 nationally. 519 people (23.0%) earned over $100,000 compared to 12.1% nationally. The employment status of those at least 15 was 1,458 (64.6%) full-time, 273 (12.1%) part-time, and 36 (1.6%) unemployed.

== Education ==
Kelson Kindergarten, situated on Taieri Crescent, provides education and care for children from two to five years of age. The kindergarten is licensed for up to 45 children. It originates from a Kelson committee formed in 1973 to establish a kindergarten in the area. Work commenced immediately, and the name of Taieri Crescent was decided. Tenders were called prior to December 1974, and it was in use by 1975. The kindergarten was extended in 1982 to include a wet-weather activities area, paid for exclusively by fundraising.

Also situated on Taieri Crescent is Kelson School, a co-educational contributing primary school. It was opened on 22 May 1978 with a roll of 113. It had a roll of 265 students as of July 2026.

== Public services ==
A popular community recycling station at the bottom of Kelson Hill was closed in 2021 when Hutt City Council distributed recycling & waste bins for every household.
