= Wingate, New Zealand =

Suburb of Lower Hutt, New Zealand

Wingate
- Suburb
- Interactive map of Wingate
- Coordinates: 41.188°S 174.953°E
- Country: New Zealand
- City: Lower Hutt
- Local authority: Hutt City Council
- Electoral ward: Central, Northern

Population (2006)
  - Total: 3,036
- Train stations: Wingate Railway Station

	Taitā	Taitā
Avalon	Wingate	Stokes Valley
Avalon	Naenae

Wingate is a mixed residential and industrial neighbourhood of Lower Hutt, in the Wellington Region of New Zealand's North Island. Served by Wingate Railway Station, the area comprises parts of the suburbs of Taitā, Avalon and Naenae. The area is home to many of Lower Hutt's manufacturing and export-oriented businesses.

The area was named after the British general, Orde Wingate, who was killed in an air crash in Burma in 1944. Wingate Railway Station was opened in 1950.

== Demographics ==
Wingate is included in the Taitā statistical areas.
