= 100 Hours =

- Genre: Reality
- Presented by: Evie Ashton
- Country of origin: New Zealand
- Original language: English

Original release
- Network: TV2
- Release: 9 June 2002 – 2002

100 Hours is a New Zealand television show filmed in Avalon, New Zealand that aired on TV2 on Sunday evenings in 2002. The show was hosted by Evie Ashton. It was a joint production between TVNZ and the Netherlands' IDTV. There were around two thousand applicants nationwide for the show.

== Format ==
Four contestants were locked in an underground bunker in a secret location with no timepieces. The contestants were required to have to learn a series of challenges, which included mind, body and dexterity types. They faced off against the others until one of them won and went on to a final. The ultimate prize of the show was a Mini Cooper. There was also an element of strategising and bluffing, as contestants attempted to gain psychological advantage.
