= Waterloo railway station, Lower Hutt =

Railway station

Waterloo
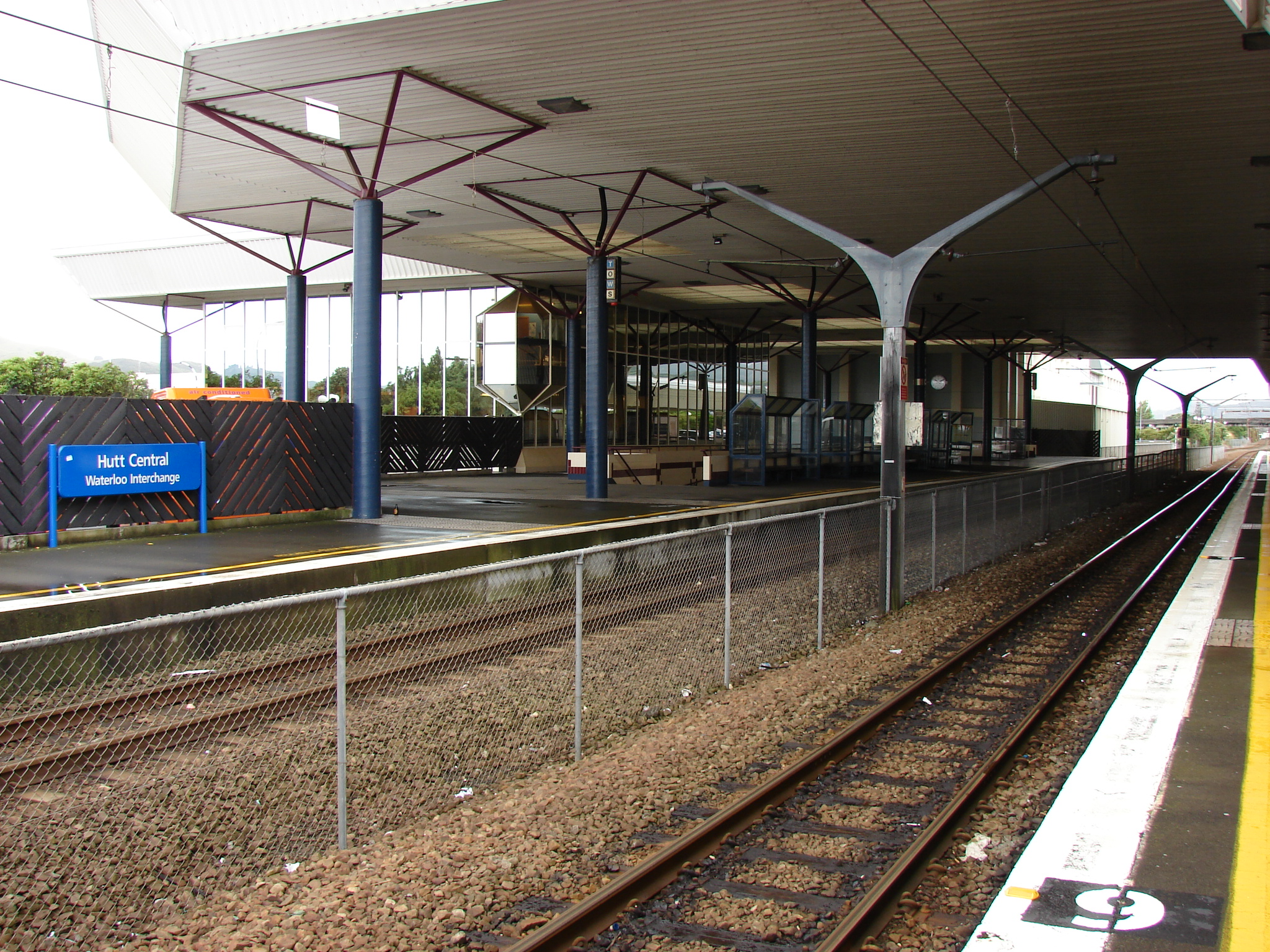

General information
- Location: Cambridge Terrace, Waterloo, Lower Hutt, New Zealand
- Coordinates: 41°12′49.77″S 174°55′15.95″E
- System: Metlink suburban rail
- Owner: Greater Wellington Regional Council
- Line: Wairarapa Line
- Platforms: Dual, side
- Tracks: Main line (2)
- Connections: Bus services

Construction
- Parking: Yes
- Cycle facilities: Yes

Other information
- Station code: WATE
- Fare zone: 4

History
- Opened: 26 May 1927; 99 years ago
- Rebuilt: December 1987 to 26 November 1988; 37 years ago
- Electrified: 12 September 1953; 73 years ago
- Former names: Waterloo

Services
Preceding station	Transdev Wellington	Following station
Epuni towards Upper Hutt	Hutt Valley Line	Woburn towards Wellington
Upper Hutt towards Masterton	Wairarapa Connection	Petone towards Wellington
Location

Waterloo railway station (previously known as Waterloo Interchange or Hutt Central) is a dual-platform suburban railway station located in Lower Hutt, New Zealand, and serving immediately the suburbs of Waterloo, Lower Hutt Central and Woburn. The station stands on the Hutt Valley section of the Wairarapa Line, 15.5 km (9.6 mi) north of Wellington. Trains stopping at Waterloo run to Wellington, Taitā, Upper Hutt and Masterton, as well as to points in between. Waterloo serves as a major bus-rail interchange, connecting buses to and from central Lower Hutt, Naenae and Wainuiomata with trains to and from Wellington.

== History ==
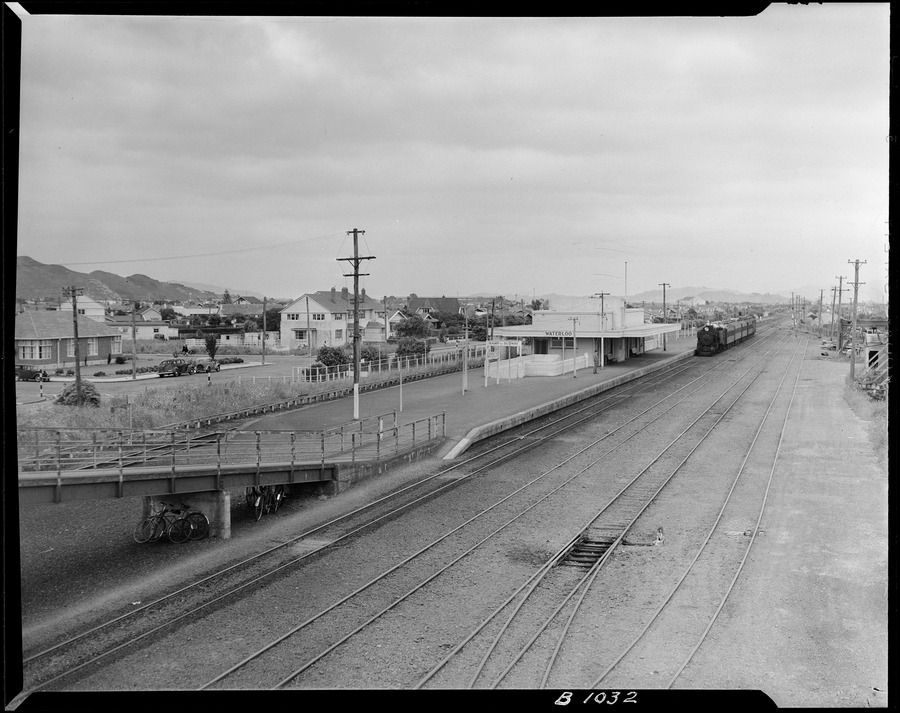
Waterloo station in 1950, looking south

Waterloo railway station opened in 1927, at the time as a terminus station on the Hutt Valley Branch between Petone and Waterloo. The mainline to the Wairarapa was on the western side of the Hutt Valley (today known as the truncated Melling Branch, rejoining the current route at Haywards, south of Upper Hutt.) With increasing traffic demands on the line between Petone and Haywards and the lack of room to double-track the line on this route, a new mainline had to be built. The line was surveyed between 1924 and 1925, with a short industrial branch leaving the Hutt Valley Branch at Woburn to serve the new Hutt Workshops.

On 26 May 1927, the rails reached Waterloo, which was then in the middle of open fields. Waterloo was the terminus of the Hutt Valley Branch line until an extension north to Naenae was opened in 1946. The station was opened with automatic, three-aspect colour light signals, which had been standard since 1924. As the station provided a direct rail connection to the port at Wellington and the surrounding land was flat, it was during the latter part of World War II that land near the station was occupied by a number of storage facilities, among them one for the United States Joint Purchasing Board.

In 1944, work began on extending the Hutt Line north to Epuni in 1945 and then to Naenae, which, as the line was being twin-tracked, required the construction of a new station. This opened in 1948 and incorporated pedestrian subways on both sides. It was always intended that Waterloo would one day serve a major population centre, in the years following World War II and the population boom that ensued, this was proved correct. Significant urban development of the Hutt Valley in the 1940s led to the decision in February 1946 to commence electrification of the railway line in 1949 and to operate electric trains between Waterloo and Wellington from August 1953. Until the connection of the Hutt Valley Branch to the Wairarapa Line and its opening as the new mainline on 1 March 1954, Waterloo served only suburban passenger services, with Upper Hutt and Wairarapa trains continuing to use the old line between Haywards and Petone on the western side of the Hutt Valley. The line was truncated to Melling at this time.

In 1986, as a result of the Hutt Valley Transport Study, Waterloo was designated an interchange for bus and rail services in preference to Woburn, which had previously had this role. It was felt that Waterloo was a more logical choice as it was closer to centres of residential and commercial interest, had sufficient room for bus platforms to be installed, and was not burdened with other operational requirements such as Woburn being the junction with the Gracefield Branch, with its loops and sidings.

In December 1987, the existing station was demolished, and construction commenced on a new interchange facility at Waterloo, which was opened on 26 November 1988. It was fully integrated with all the new public transport routes and timetables by the following March. The new building incorporated offices for New Zealand Railways Road Services (NZRRS) and on the southwest side, a bus park and workshop for their fleet. The NZRRS was soon separated from the railways management structure, and as they relocated to another site, the offices became empty. Despite being 1.4km from the central business district, the station was also called Hutt Central for a period.

On 29 June 2021, the Greater Wellington Regional Council announced plans for a new transport interchange to replace the existing station at a projected cost of $20.25 million.

== Services ==
=== Rail ===
Transdev Wellington, on behalf of the Greater Wellington Regional Council, operates Hutt Valley Line electric suburban services between Wellington and Upper Hutt via Waterloo. It also operates the Wairarapa Connection diesel-hauled service between Wellington and Masterton via Waterloo. The basic daytime off-peak timetable is:

- 3 trains per hour (tph) Hutt Valley Line services to Wellington, stopping all stations.
- 3 tph Hutt Valley Line services to Upper Hutt, stopping all stations.
- Two Wairarapa Connection services to Wellington, stopping Petone only.
- Two Wairarapa Connection services to Masterton, stopping all stations from Upper Hutt.

The basic morning peak timetable is:

- 6 tph Hutt Valley Line to Wellington, split:
  - 3 tph stopping all stations to Petone
  - 3 tph non-stop
- 2 tph Hutt Valley Line to Upper Hutt, stopping all stations
- Three Wairarapa Connection services to Wellington, stopping Petone only.

=== Bus ===
Metlink bus routes 121, 130, 145, 149, 150, 160 and 170 serve Waterloo. 145 and 149 only run to and from Waterloo during peak time on weekdays
