= Naenae College =

- Naenae Kāreti

Location
- 910 High Street, Avalon, Lower Hutt 5011, New Zealand; 41.1968°S 174.9414°E

Information
- Funding type: State
- Motto: motto: Kia ihi, kia maru. (Māori: Be strong, be steadfast.)
- Established: 1953
- Ministry of Education Institution no.: 259
- Principal: Chris Taylor
- Years offered: 9–13
- Gender: Coeducational
- Enrolment: 871 (July 2026)
- Hours in school day: 8:45 am–3:05 pm
- Houses: Four: Koruru; Maihi; Amo; Tokomanawa
- Colours: Red and Blue
- Socio-economic decile: 3G
- Website: www.naenae-college.school.nz

Naenae College is a state-run coeducational secondary school located in north-central Lower Hutt, New Zealand. It is situated on a 12-hectare (30-acre) site in the suburb of Avalon. The school was founded in 1953 to serve the Naenae state housing development, although the school is located in the suburb of Avalon.

The school has an enrolment of 871 students from Years 9 to 13 (ages 12 to 18) as of July 2026. Chris Taylor took over as Principal from acting principal John Russell in October 2023.

== History ==
Construction of Naenae began the late 1940s under Prime Minister Peter Fraser and the First Labour Government. It was supposed to become a "designer community" of suburban state housing. With the raising of the school leaving age from fourteen to fifteen in 1944, the expansion of Naenae and wider Lower Hutt, and the start of the post-World War II baby boom, Naenae College was built to accommodate secondary school students north of central Lower Hutt.

Naenae College was a prototype for a standardised building design to be used at other new secondary schools across New Zealand. The school was built with long two-story wings of classrooms facing onto corridors, constructed with reinforced concrete on the first level and timber above that. However, construction of the so-called "Naenae type school" was too slow and expensive for a large scale building programme, and subsequently, the Naenae type was largely replaced with a single-storey all-timber version known as the "Henderson type school". Both types lasted four years before being phased out in 1957 in place of self-contained classroom blocks.

The school opened for instruction at the beginning of 1953.

In the most recent 'Managing National Assessment Report' by the New Zealand Qualifications Authority (NZQA), conducted in 2018, it was stated, "This review identified inconsistencies in resubmission practice where some teachers offer resubmissions to all students regardless of their grades."

In 2019 it was announced that due to monetary trouble, the Ministry of Education wiped $760,000 of $1m still owed by Naenae College from a 1.6 million dollar loan it received in 2004, this was largest loan ever given to a school by the Crown. Principal Nic Richards had written to the Ministry advising that the servicing of the debt meant that the school's property was in "very poor condition", and it reduced the resources that were available to students.

The 2023 report from the Education Review Office (ERO) identified multiple areas of non-compliance during the board assurance process, and observed that "the school has noticed reduced retention, attendance and engagement."

Naenae College is one of 790 low decile schools in New Zealand that is part of the free school lunch programme.

== Enrolment ==
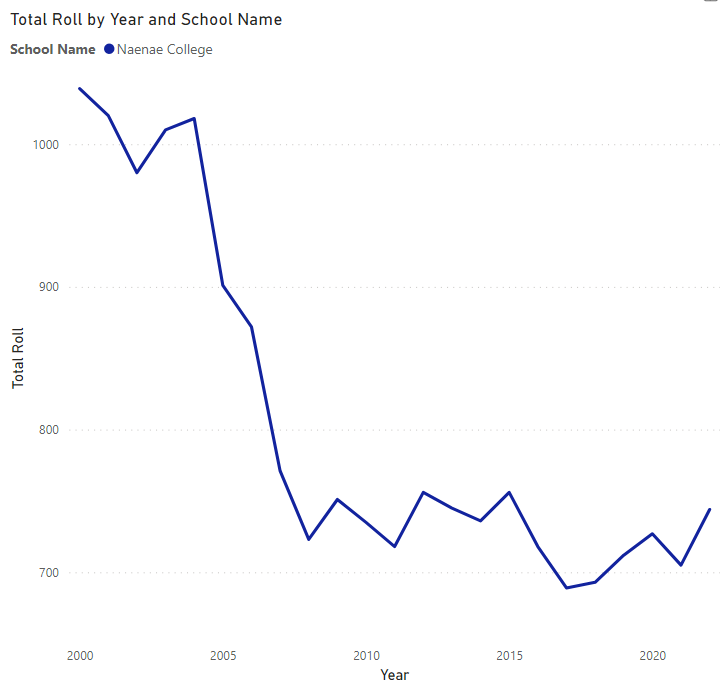
Naenae College roll by year

As of July 2026, Naenae College has a roll of 871 students, of which 247 (28.4%) identify as Māori.

As of 2026, Naenae College has an Equity Index of 500, placing it amongst schools whose students have many socioeconomic barriers to achievement (roughly equivalent to deciles 2 and 3 under the former socio-economic decile system).

== Academic performance ==
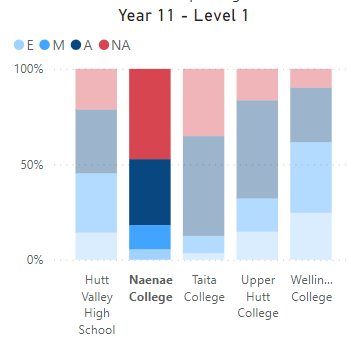
Naenae College's NCEA level 1 results from 2018 to 2022.

In 2024, 67.8% of students leaving Naenae College attained at least NCEA Level 1, 62.8% attained at least NCEA Level 2, and 41.0% attained at least NCEA Level 3. For schools of a similar equity index, the attainment rates were 77.0%, 65.9%, and 42.1% respectively.

== Board of trustees ==
The Naenae College Board of Trustees consists of eleven elected and appointed members.

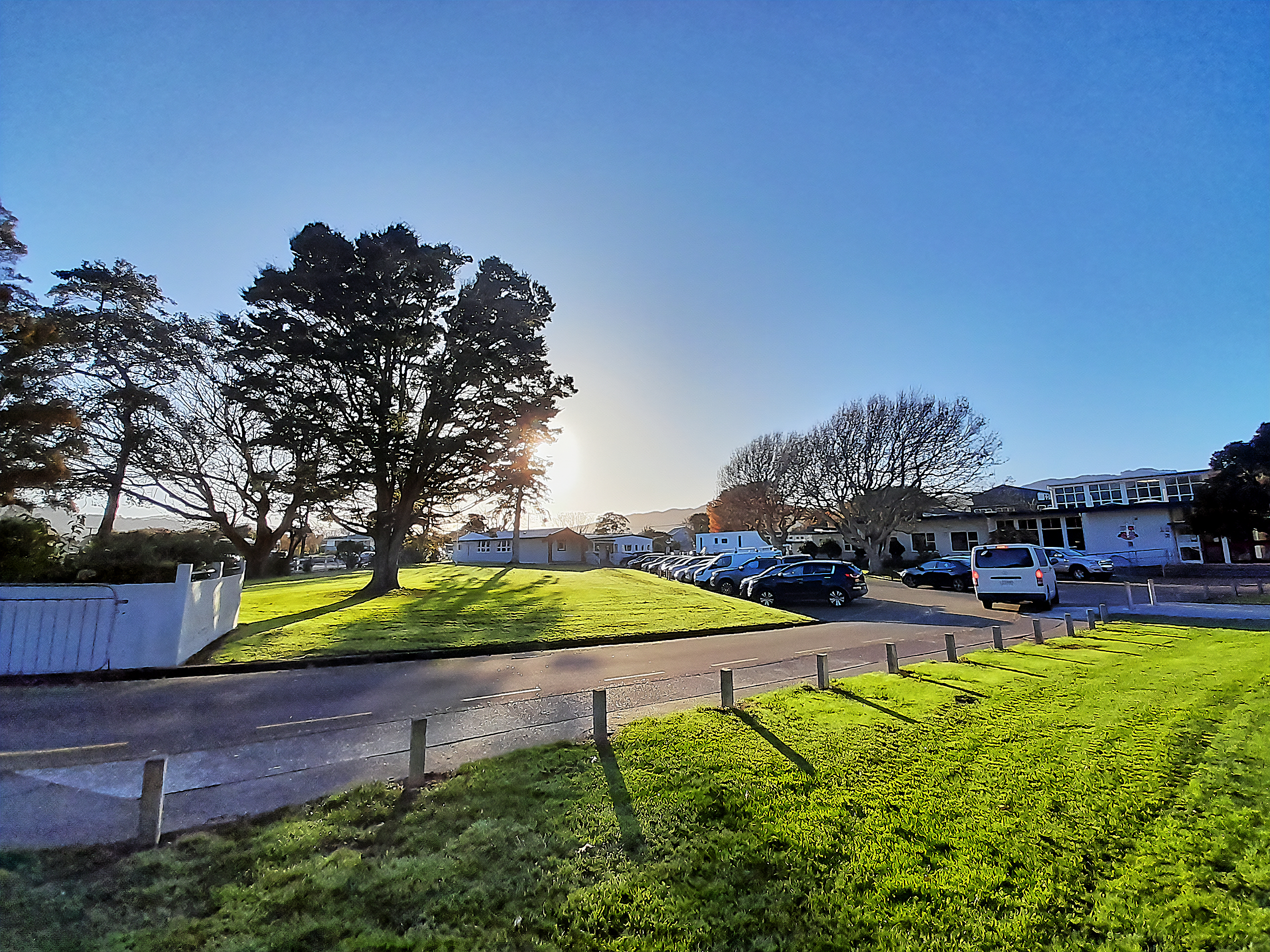
Front Grounds (June 2022)

== Principals ==
Period	Principal	Notes
1953–1966	Ian Johnson	Foundation principal.
1967–1980	Derek Wood	Initiated the building of the wharenui at the front of the school.
1981–1988	Bruce Murray	
1989–2007	John Lambert	
2008–2017	John Russell	Introduced 90 minute periods.
2017–2023	Nic Richards	
2023–present	Chris Taylor	
Note: This does not include Acting Principals.

== Notable staff ==
- Bruce Murray, international cricketer – served as principal from 1981 to 1988
- Allan Peachey, former New Zealand politician and MP - Former Head of Commerce Department

== Notable alumni ==
=== Business ===
- Sir Bob Jones – (attended 1953–1957) businessman and former politician; foundation pupil.
- Sir Paul Adams – businessman and politician
- Mario Wynands – Game developer, CEO of PikPok

=== Public service ===
- Sir Stephen Kós – judge at the Supreme Court of New Zealand and former President of the Court of Appeal of New Zealand.
- Marama Davidson – New Zealand politician
- Craig Foss – politician and investment banker
- Tony Kunowski – New Zealand politician

=== Broadcasting and journalism ===
- Dan Wootton – journalist and broadcaster
- Jane Tolerton – New Zealand biographer, journalist and historian

=== The arts ===
- Brooke Fraser – (attended c. 1997–2001), singer-songwriter
- Peter Hambleton – New Zealand stage, film and television actor
- Aaron Tokona – Musician with Weta and Fly My Pretties.
- Michael Hedges – sound engineer
- William Cate and William Robinson aka Bill and Boyd – (attended mid-1950s), pop music duo
- Sarah Jane Parton – New Media Artist
- Luke Whaanga – on New Zealand Idol.
- Monica Galetti – Samoan-born New Zealand Chef
- Andy Anderson – Actor/musician

=== Sport ===
- Billy Graham – New Zealand boxer
- Shaun Easthope – Samoan footballer
- Trish Hina – female rugby union player
- Mark Sorenson - softball player and coach

=== Science ===
- Chris Sibley – Professor

== Coat of Arms ==
Coat of arms of Naenae College

Notes
The crest was made by R. Barclay - Staff Member.
Motto
Māori: Kia Ihi, kia maru. (Be strong, be steadfast in your identity.)
Other elements
The 'cross' stands for the Christian principles on which the community is founded upon.

The 'four stars' represent the Southern Cross which is a symbol of New Zealand.

The 'wavy blue and silver lines' represent the Hutt River, near the College.

The 'keys' are symbols of knowledge and represent the work of the College in education.

On the top of the shield is a Maori symbol, the Tekoteko, surmounting a European symbol, the Knight's helmet; and on either side of these is decorative mantling. These symbols represent the multi-cultural traditions of the College and community.
