= Taitā, New Zealand =

Suburb of Lower Hutt, New Zealand

Coordinates: 41.180°S 174.960°E

Taitā
- Suburb
- Interactive map of Taitā
- Country: New Zealand
- City: Lower Hutt City
- Local authority: Hutt City Council
- Electoral ward: Northern Ward

Area
  - Land: 455 ha (1,120 acres)

Population (June 2025)
  - Total: 6,920
  - Density: 1,520/km^{2} (3,940/sq mi)
- Train stations: Taitā railway station

		Pomare
Kelson	Taitā	Stokes Valley
Avalon	Wingate

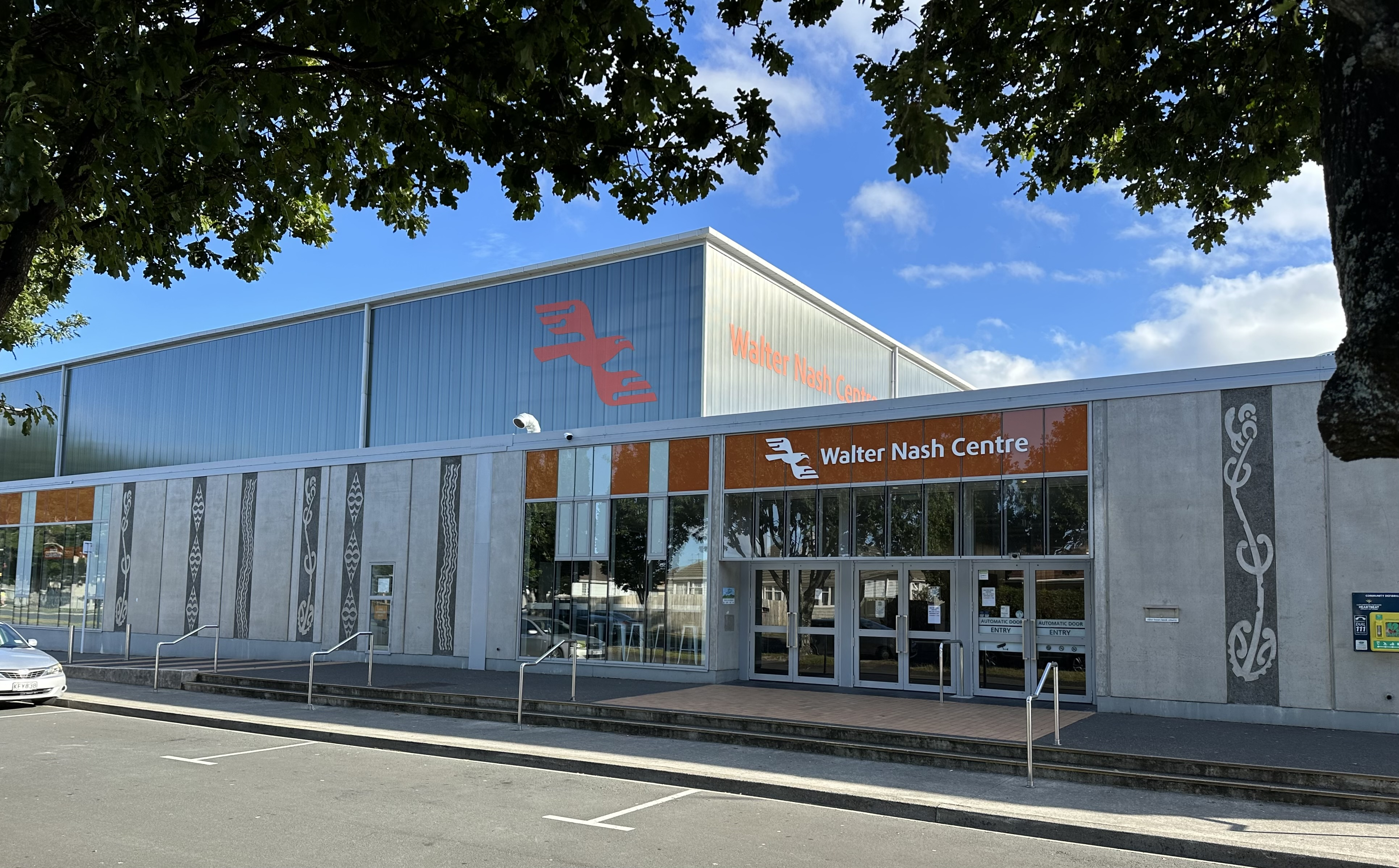
The Walter Nash Centre, Taitā, Lower Hutt

Taitā (/ˈtaɪtə/) is one of the northernmost suburbs of the city of Lower Hutt in New Zealand, situated toward the northern end of the city. It lies considerably south of the Taitā Gorge which separates Lower Hutt City from Upper Hutt City, and to the west of the Taitā Cemetery in the suburb of Naenae.

The historic Christ Church, erected in 1853, is the oldest surviving church building in the Wellington region.

Taitā's urban development began around the middle of the 20th century as part of the Labour Government's state-housing scheme. The Taitā railway station opened in 1947 to serve the developing suburb.

The main road through the western part of the suburb, Taita Drive, has its southern end in the suburb of Avalon, south of the Kennedy-Good Bridge.

On the eastern side of Taitā, above Taita College, stand the buildings of the former Department of Scientific and Industrial Research (DSIR) Soil Bureau. The Soil Bureau became part of Landcare Research New Zealand Limited in 1992 and much of the functionality formerly carried out at Taitā has moved to the Turitea campus of Massey University in Palmerston North.

In December 2019, the approved official geographic name of the suburb was gazetted as "Taitā".

== Demographics ==
Taitā, comprising the statistical areas of Taita North and Taita South, covers 4.55 km^{2} (1.76 sq mi) and includes Pomare and Wingate. It had an estimated population of 6,920 as of June 2025, with a population density of 1,521 people per km^{2}.

Historical population
Year	Pop.	±% p.a.
2006	6,057	—
2013	5,538	−1.27%
2018	6,153	+2.13%
2023	6,390	+0.76%

Taitā had a population of 6,390 in the 2023 New Zealand census, an increase of 237 people (3.9%) since the 2018 census, and an increase of 852 people (15.4%) since the 2013 census. There were 3,144 males, 3,231 females, and 18 people of other genders in 2,202 dwellings. 3.8% of people identified as LGBTIQ+. There were 1,329 people (20.8%) aged under 15 years, 1,410 (22.1%) aged 15 to 29, 2,874 (45.0%) aged 30 to 64, and 777 (12.2%) aged 65 or older.

People could identify as more than one ethnicity. The results were 42.6% European (Pākehā); 26.1% Māori; 29.2% Pasifika; 19.7% Asian; 3.1% Middle Eastern, Latin American and African New Zealanders (MELAA); and 1.5% other, which includes people giving their ethnicity as "New Zealander". English was spoken by 93.1%, Māori by 7.2%, Samoan by 12.7%, and other languages by 19.3%. No language could be spoken by 2.9% (e.g. too young to talk). New Zealand Sign Language was known by 0.9%. The percentage of people born overseas was 30.7, compared with 28.8% nationally.

Religious affiliations were 42.3% Christian, 5.2% Hindu, 2.0% Islam, 2.0% Māori religious beliefs, 1.8% Buddhist, 0.4% New Age, 0.1% Jewish, and 1.3% other religions. People who answered that they had no religion were 38.2%, and 6.9% of people did not answer the census question.

Of those at least 15 years old, 948 (18.7%) people had a bachelor's or higher degree, 2,448 (48.4%) had a post-high school certificate or diploma, and 1,668 (33.0%) people exclusively held high school qualifications. 339 people (6.7%) earned over $100,000 compared to 12.1% nationally. The employment status of those at least 15 was 2,592 (51.2%) full-time, 519 (10.3%) part-time, and 249 (4.9%) unemployed.

Individual statistical areas
Name	Area (km^{2})	Population	Density (per km^{2})	Dwellings	Median age	Median income
Taita North	1.15	3,198	2,781	1,050	33.5 years	$37,000
Taita South	3.40	3,192	939	1,152	33.7 years	$37,700
New Zealand					38.1 years	$41,500

== Education ==
Taitā has four schools:

- Pomare School, a state contributing primary (Year 1 to 6) school with 89 students. It opened in 1948.
- St Michael's School, a state-integrated Catholic full primary (Year 1 to 8) school with 123 students. It started in 1951, sharing an army hut with a church and hall. It moved to separate premises in 1953.
- Taita Central School, a state contributing primary (Year 1 to 6) school with 107 students. The school opened in 1948. In February 1979, a fire destroyed the school, but it was rebuilt by July.
- Taita College, a state secondary (Year 9 to 13) school with 345 students. The school opened in 1957.

All these schools are co-educational. Rolls are as of March 2026.

Intermediate (Year 7 and 8) students from Taitā can attend Avalon Intermediate School, in the neighbouring suburb of Avalon.

== Climate ==
Climate data for Lower Hutt (Taita) (1971–2000)
Month	Jan	Feb	Mar	Apr	May	Jun	Jul	Aug	Sep	Oct	Nov	Dec	Year
Mean daily maximum °C (°F)	21.0 (69.8)	21.5 (70.7)	19.9 (67.8)	17.5 (63.5)	14.9 (58.8)	12.5 (54.5)	12.0 (53.6)	12.6 (54.7)	14.0 (57.2)	15.5 (59.9)	17.2 (63.0)	19.1 (66.4)	16.5 (61.7)
Daily mean °C (°F)	17.0 (62.6)	17.2 (63.0)	15.8 (60.4)	13.5 (56.3)	11.1 (52.0)	9.1 (48.4)	8.4 (47.1)	8.9 (48.0)	10.5 (50.9)	12.0 (53.6)	13.5 (56.3)	15.4 (59.7)	12.7 (54.9)
Mean daily minimum °C (°F)	13.0 (55.4)	12.8 (55.0)	11.7 (53.1)	9.5 (49.1)	7.3 (45.1)	5.6 (42.1)	4.7 (40.5)	5.3 (41.5)	7.0 (44.6)	8.4 (47.1)	9.7 (49.5)	11.7 (53.1)	8.9 (48.0)
Average rainfall mm (inches)	73.2 (2.88)	74.0 (2.91)	108.1 (4.26)	83.1 (3.27)	128.1 (5.04)	119.4 (4.70)	132.1 (5.20)	100.8 (3.97)	81.7 (3.22)	94.9 (3.74)	101.0 (3.98)	98.1 (3.86)	1,194.5 (47.03)
Mean monthly sunshine hours	221.0	200.2	159.4	134.7	102.6	84.1	95.7	104.8	132.4	180.1	204.9	209.6	1,829.5
Source: NIWA (rain 1981–2010)
