= Naenae =

Suburb of Lower Hutt, New Zealand

- Suburb
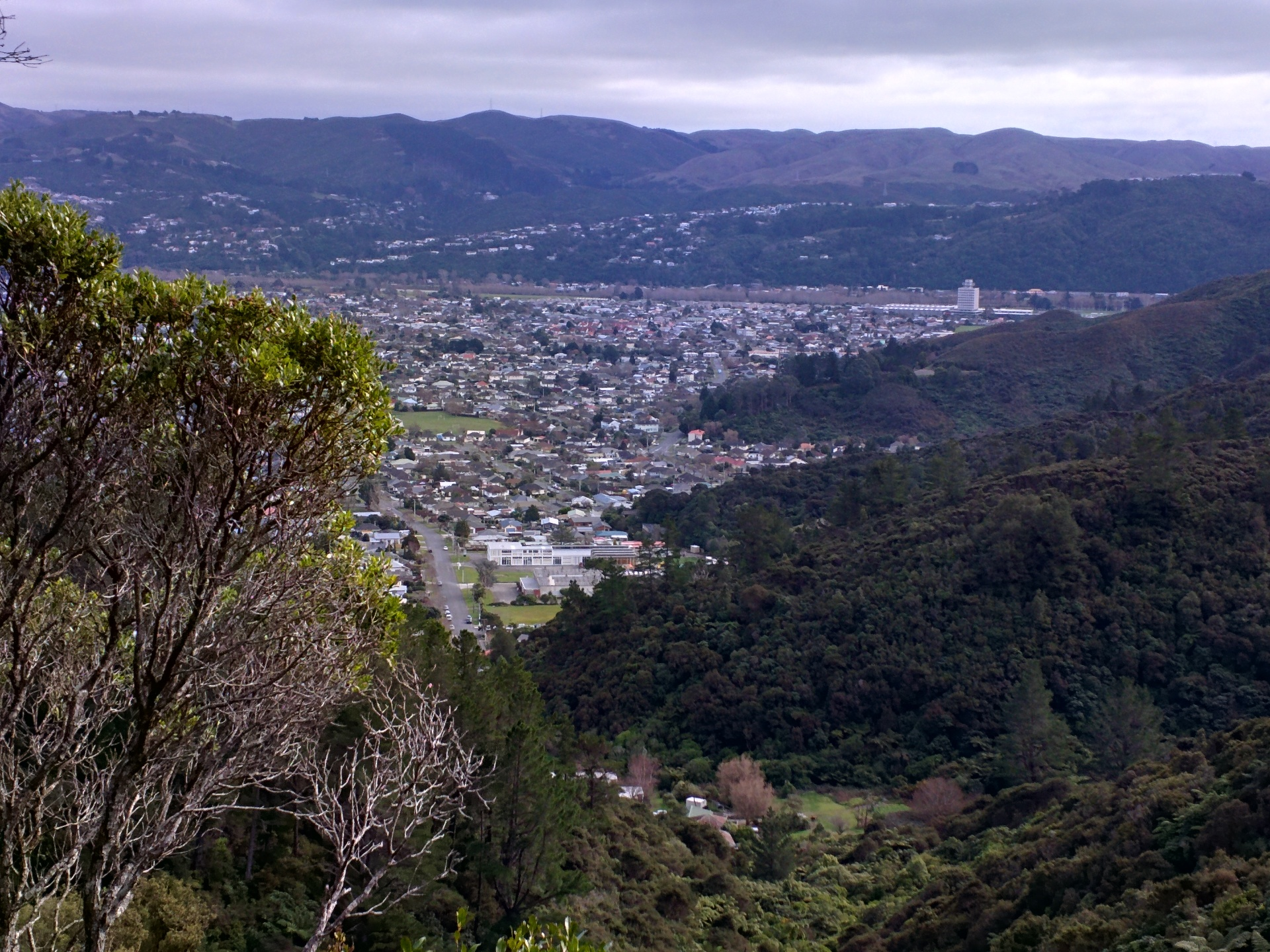
- Interactive map of Naenae
- Coordinates: 41.2002°S 174.9525°E
- Country: New Zealand
- City: Lower Hutt
- Local authority: Hutt City Council
- Electoral ward: Northern

Area
  - Land: 518 ha (1,280 acres)

Population (June 2025)
  - Total: 9,300
  - Density: 1,800/km^{2} (4,600/sq mi)
- Train stations: Naenae railway station

| Avalon | Wingate |
| Boulcott | Naenae |
| Epuni |

Location of Naenae within Wellington

Naenae (/ˈnaɪnaɪ/, occasionally spelled NaeNae) is a suburb of Lower Hutt, New Zealand. It lies on the eastern edge of the floodplain of the Hutt River, four kilometres from the Lower Hutt central business district. A small tributary of the Hutt, the Waiwhetū Stream, flows through the suburb. Naenae lies 19.7 km from Wellington Central.

== Toponymy ==
Early newspapers refer to the area as Naenae, Nainai, Te Naenae, the Naenae and so on. Naenae or nae-nae is a Māori word meaning "mosquito" or "sandfly", and is widely believed to recall a time prior to the draining of the area, when the mosquito population predominated. The New Zealand Geographic Board authorised Naenae as the correct spelling in 1929.

However, the name of the suburb 'Naenae' is an incorrect recording by settler populations of the traditional Māori name Te Ngaengae, which means 'to cause effect through rupture'. The story of Naenae begins with Māui raising the fish Hāhā-te-Whenua, and his brothers cutting the fish and creating mountains, lakes and rivers. There was said to be a freshwater lake where Taitā Cemetery is now. Two man-eating taniwha dwelled there, and people were banned from going into the water because they would disappear. One day a child slipped in and the two taniwha raced towards the child and tore each other apart. Thus two rivers were created: Waiwhetū and Te Awamutu. Taniwha are unexplained phenomena, not necessarily the large monsters they are often represented as. Te Ngaengae could be 'volcanic activity underwater'. Māui's fish was called Hāhā-te-Whenua – a reference to plates shifting under the water.

== Setting ==
Naenae occupies a basin and the lower slopes of the Eastern Hills in the upper reaches of the Waiwhetū Stream catchment area. The basin is divided into northern and southern areas by a spur of the Eastern Hills. At Naenae, a Holocene-era swamp deposit of loose silt, sand and gravel with beds of peat lies between two alluvial fans. A drillhole bored at Naenae found up to 30 m of silt and inter-bedded peat. The swampy area may be prone to liquefaction, although this was not reported after the 1855 or 1942 Wairarapa earthquakes.

=== Waiwhetū Stream ===
The stream has its headwaters in the Eastern Hutt hills, above the suburbs of Wingate and Naenae in Lower Hutt. It has a catchment area of around 18 square kilometres (1,800 ha). The stream is around 9 kilometres (5.6 mi) in length and passes through the eastern suburbs of Fairfield, Waterloo, and Waiwhetū, and the industrial areas of Seaview and Gracefield before entering the estuary of the Hutt River Te Awa Kairangi as it reaches Wellington Harbour. A 2.3-km section of the stream at Naenae has been formed into a concrete channel, known in the 1940s and 1950s as Waddington Canal. This was created in an attempt to improve drainage and run-off from the hills. From 2015 to 2017, volunteers planted plants along the concrete berms of the channel and in some areas placed rocks in the channel itself to slow down the water flow, which enabled īnanga (a species of native fish) to travel upstream.

== History ==
=== Early development ===
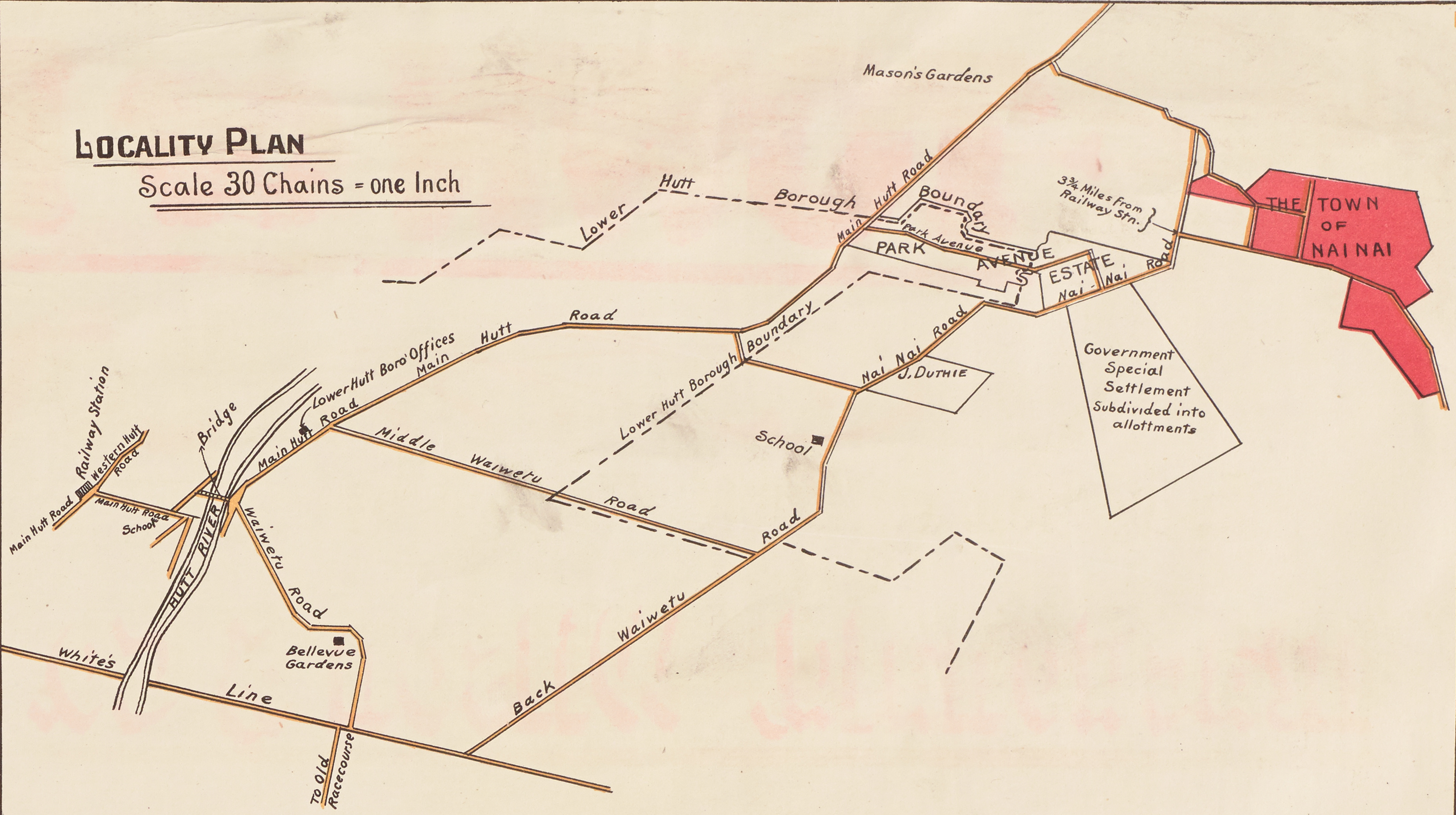
Detail from a 1906 advertisement, showing the government's 1905 land purchase and the "Town of Nai Nai" where plots were available for purchase by the public. Duthie's estate is also shown.

From the early days of European settlement, land in the area around Naenae and Taitā was used for market gardens and supplied vegetables for the Wellington region.

In 1905, the government bought 143 acres of land at the south of Naenae, and in 1906, 46 sections at the newly laid out "Town of Nainai" further north were sold to the public. The land was suitable "for poultry farming, and other purposes" and an advertisement promised "the wonderful character of the soil for horticultural purposes". The land was lavishly described as "carefully selected for its picturesque beauty, for its productive power, for its unrivalled sunny aspect, for its healthy character, and for its accessibility to all the main roads".

The 1911 census of New Zealand recorded only 136 people living at Naenae, and by 1916 this had risen to 316.

=== Waddington ===
When 143 acres of land at the south of present-day Naenae was sold to the government in June 1905, there were allegations that the government had paid too much and the land was too swampy to build on. A committee investigated the deal in 1910. The land was divided into 376 sections and became known as the Waddington Estate. (The main street through the area was Seddon Street, named after Richard Seddon, and Waddington was the surname of Seddon's wife's grandmother.) The government had intended to build homes for workers, but there was little demand from potential settlers because the area was too far away from business centres where working-class people might seek work.

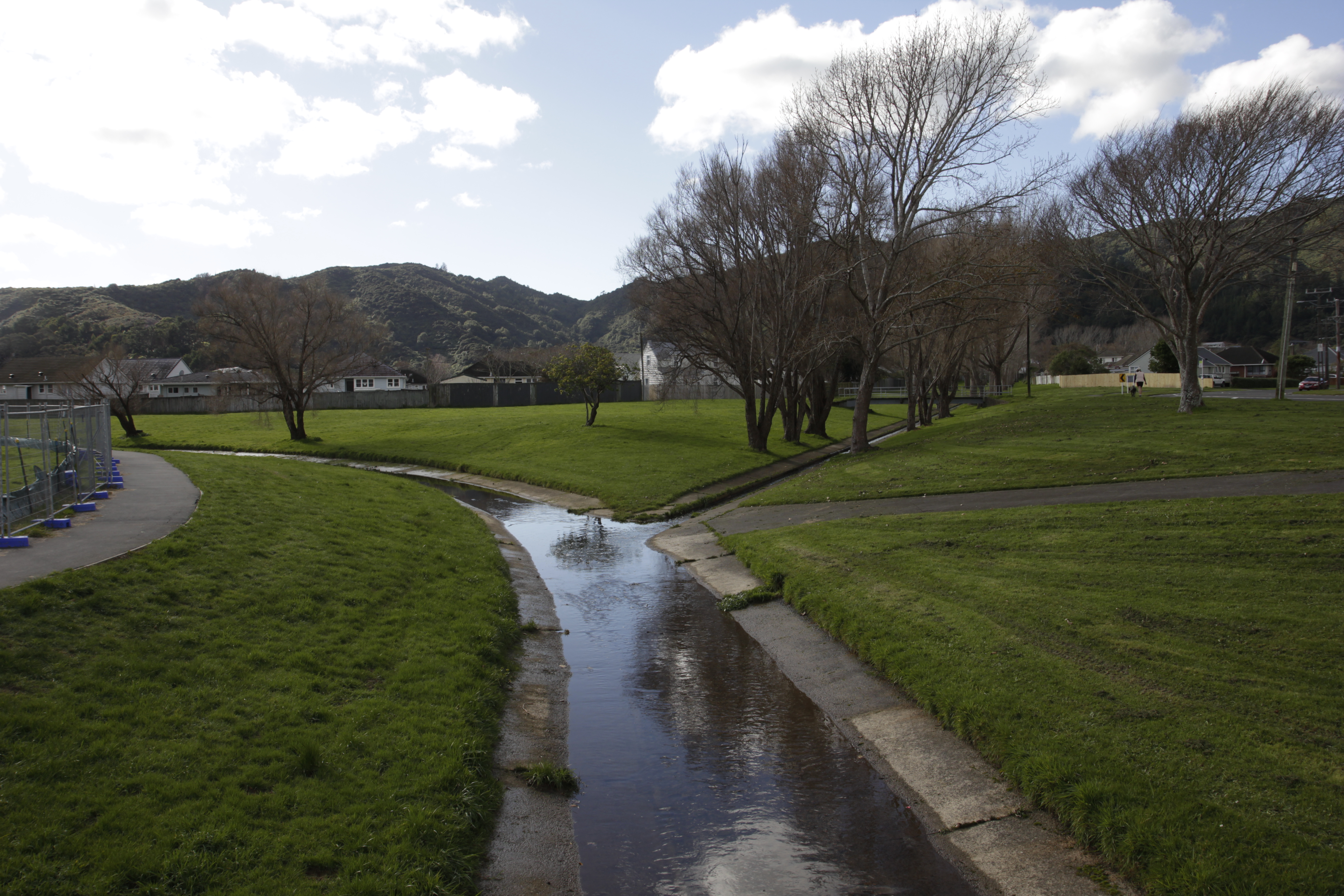
Waiwhetū Stream at Naenae Park

Farmers and gardeners at Waddington struggled due to the boggy ground and flooding caused by run-off from watercourses coming off the hills surrounding the basin. Drainage work was undertaken in 1918 to make the area more suitable for market gardening: small streams were diverted into concrete channels which fed into the Waiwhetū Stream, and the upper part of the Waiwhetū Stream was deepened and straightened into a canal bordered by wide public reserves. The large swamp at the centre of Waddington disappeared, and between 1918 and 1937 the land was used mainly for grazing, poultry and market gardens. In 1922, 20 acres was opened up for settlement by returned soldiers.

The government began planning a huge state housing project at Waddington in 1937. At the same time, railways and roads were being built in the Hutt Valley and there was a massive demand for manpower. In the early 1940s a workingmen's camp was established at Waddington to house up to 500 men working on public projects. By the mid-1940s the state houses were built and occupied and the population of Waddington was growing rapidly. In May 1946 the government announced that it would shift the workers to Petone and use the camp buildings for a new temporary primary school. Waddington School opened in October 1946 in 12 classrooms in the former camp buildings, catering for 350 children in the Naenae-Waddington area who had previously attended Hutt Central School. The school closed around 1950 when a new purpose-built school was opened at Naenae.

In 1947 and 1948 there were calls to change the name of Waddington, since there was a locality in the South Island with the same name. Lower Hutt City Council advised the New Zealand Geographic Board that it did not recognise Waddington as an official name, and the name fell out of use after this period. Waddington Drive in Naenae exists as a reminder of the former name of the area.

=== State housing ===
When the government raised the idea of a state housing development at Naenae in 1937, there were protests that it was a waste of an area with good soil for market gardens. Undersecretary for Housing John A Lee said that it was better to transport vegetables longer distances than force people to travel further to work. In 1944, 1000 state houses were constructed at the south of Naenae around Seddon Street, in an area then known as the Waddington Estate. Many of these homes were built quickly using prefabrication, a new technique at the time. Sections of the houses were made in a factory in Miramar and trucked to Naenae, where the whole exterior shell of a house could be erected in a day or two. A small community co-operative shopping area was built at the intersection of Seddon Street and Waddington Drive to service the new housing area. Another housing area was created north of Naenae Road. In the late 1950s a block of Star Flats, apartment-style state housing, was built at Naenae Road. As of 2019, about 47% of Naenae's homes were part of the state housing sector. New state houses were built at Naenae in 2020.

=== Post-war boom ===
As Lower Hutt expanded during the 1940s, the Labour Party government under Peter Fraser selected Naenae as an ideal site to become a "designer community", a model suburb of sorts, where a substantial shopping centre would complement a suburban state-housing estate. This community centre would serve as a social hub for the greater area. Ernst Plischke, an Austrian architect, designed plans for the new community centre between 1942 and 1943. However, government architect Gordon Wilson later drastically changed the design. The planners hoped to encourage nuclear-family life in such a scheme, but due to the increasing urbanization of New Zealand, demand for housing outstripped the need for such centres, leaving the scheme only partially realised .

The population of Naenae increased from 548 in 1926 to 22,000 by 1958 as a result of the large state housing programme. Naenae Railway Station opened in 1946 on the Hutt Valley section of the Wairarapa Line. The railway provided direct access to Wellington for the rapidly-increasing suburb.

A light industry zone was established next to the railway line and by 1958 businesses in operation included a bakery supplying most of the Hutt Valley with bread, an engineering works, a printing ink company and a timber treatment plant. Philips, a Dutch company which produced televisions and radios, built a large factory at Naenae in 1956 in anticipation of the arrival of television in New Zealand. Television production at Naenae ended in 1988 after reduced import tariffs made it uneconomical to manufacture televisions locally. The last television set produced in this factory was made on 11 June 1988. Resene Paints occupied the buildings as of 2007. Rembrandt Suits established a factory in Naenae in the 1950s and was still operating from the site in 2012.

A shopping centre opened in the 1950s at Hillary Court and Everest Avenue (named after Edmund Hillary's conquest of Mt Everest in 1953) had 42 shops and two banks, and Wellington's first post-war picture theatre, the 700-seat Regent, opened in June 1958.

Naenae's post-modern Post Office building (officially opened in 1959, closed as a postal centre in 2016) pays homage to the Art Deco era main Post Office in Lower Hutt town centre.

By the late 1960s, Naenae's population had started to decrease as children in families who had moved to the area in the 1940s and 1950s had grown up and left home.

=== Decline ===
Naenae suffered a downturn from the mid-1980s when new Government economic policies were introduced. Lower tariffs on imported goods and removal of subsidies for local manufacturers led to the closure of many businesses in the Hutt Valley, increasing unemployment in working-class areas like Naenae. Many shops in the formerly bustling Hillary Court closed, due to various factors including anti-social behaviour in the area, the advent of supermarkets and big-barn shopping and increased mobility that enabled residents to shop in other areas like Lower Hutt. By 2008, a report identified Naenae as a highly socio-economically deprived area with a highly mobile population, more single-parent families than the national average, unskilled workers and overcrowded homes. Although the suburb had many parks, sports clubs and facilities, these were under-used by residents.

=== Revival ===
Attempts to improve public amenities and perceptions of safety began in Naenae in the early 2000s. In 2004, local residents established a charitable trust which they named TEAM ["Together everyone achieves more"] Naenae Trust, or TNT. The trust worked with Hutt City Council on ways to improve Naenae, resulting in installation of CCTV cameras in Hillary court to improve safety, removal of graffiti, and waterblasting and painting shopfronts in the shopping area. TNT put forward the idea of using the old post office for a community centre, which eventuated in 2024. TNT runs various community groups and programmes.

Large murals were created to deter tagging and make the area more attractive. Examples include a mural on a shop wall at Seddon Street, created in 2016, and a mural 180m long painted on a wall around Walter Mildenhall Park in 2016–2017.

The subway to the railway station was upgraded by Metlink during 2023, with new lighting, CCTV and a new colour scheme incorporating Māori designs. Work on the project was delayed by numerous cases of vandalism and regular instances of antisocial and threatening behaviour and intimidation towards contractors working on the site, who sometimes had to stop work for their own safety. The upgraded subway was opened in May 2024.

A new community centre opened on 27 June 2024 in the former post office in Hillary Court. It includes co-working office-style spaces, meeting rooms, a kitchen and a large activity space. The community centre features a re-creation of a large mural that was in the old post office. The mural made of linoleum was designed by Guy Ngan in 1959 and was the first mural to be installed in a New Zealand post office. Remnants of the original mural were uncovered during renovations for the community centre. The whole work was re-created in fibre acoustic panels and installed in the new community centre as a link to the building's past life as a post office.

The new swimming pool complex opened in December 2024, and Walter Mildenhall Park situated next to the pool is being redeveloped, with the work expected to be completed in late 2025.

== Points of interest ==
=== Swimming pool ===
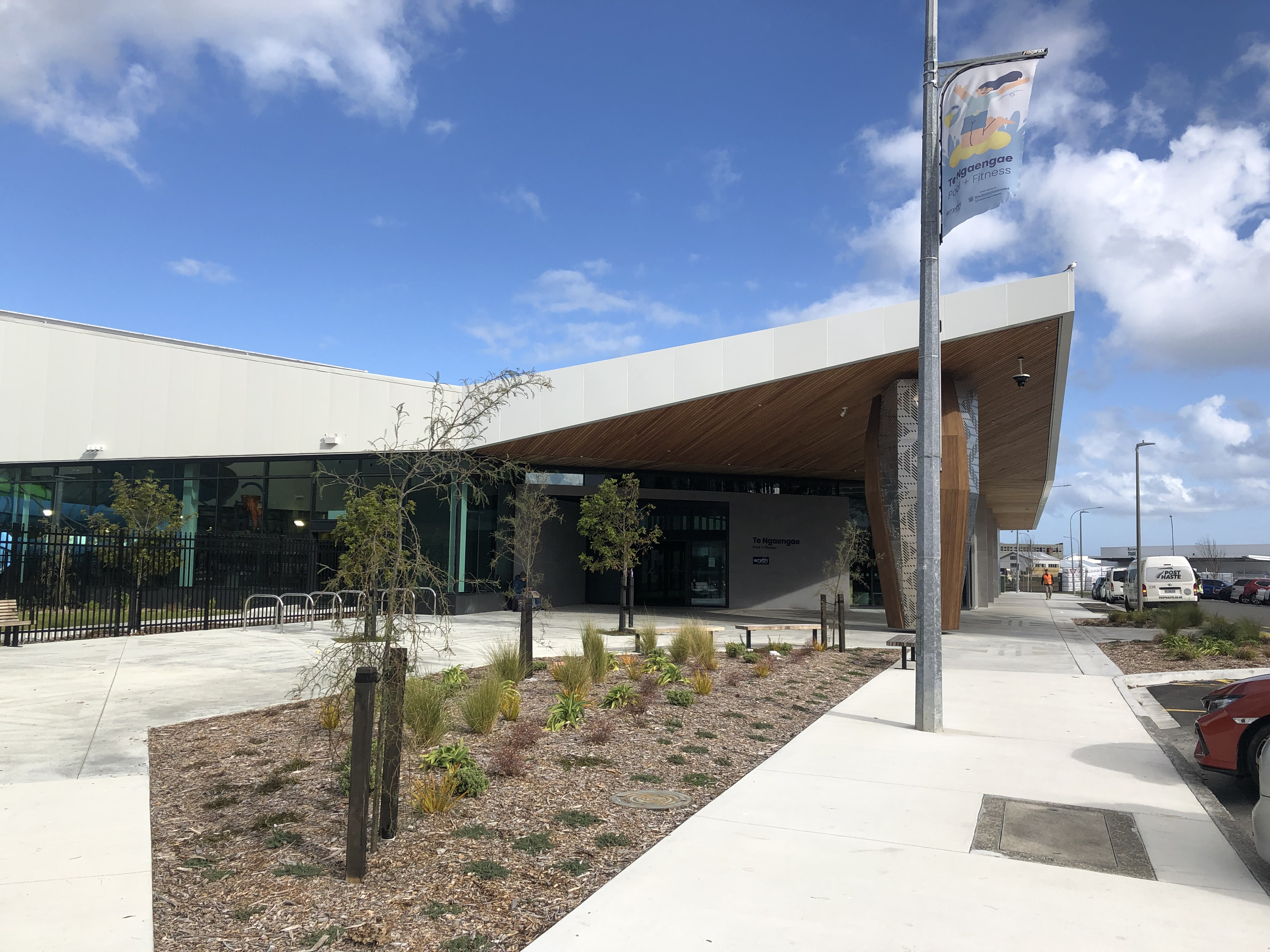
Te Ngaengae Pool and fitness centre

Naenae's shopping centre contained an Olympic-size swimming pool, built when New Zealand hosted an international diving championships. The pool was opened on 10 November 1956, and had three diving boards. Originally open-air, a roof over the pool was completed in 1987, making it usable all year round. A hydro slide was constructed adjacent to the main pool in the same project. The toddlers' paddling pool remained open-air for a few more years. At the time of the completion of the roof, the pool was the only facility in Wellington with both a 50‑metre pool and competition diving platforms.

The pool closed in April 2019 due to earthquake concerns. In 2021, the Hutt City Council approved a budget of $68m for replacing the pool as part of their 10-year plan. In 2020, the council had funding support of $27m from central government. Demolition of the original pool began in 2021, in preparation for redevelopment. In 2022, the former Community Hall was demolished in preparation for the new build. In December 2024 the rebuilt pool, named Te Ngaengae Pool and Fitness, opened. It contains a 50‑metre Olympic pool, a second leisure pool, two hydro slides, and a fitness centre.

=== Balgownie House ===
Balgownie House is a large wooden house in Hamerton Street. It was built in 1900 for businessman and politician, John Duthie, when the area was still very rural. Visitors could go boating on the Waiwhetū Stream which ran through the extensive property. Duthie and his family lived in the house from 1903 until 1915. The house later became a boys' orphanage and hostel named St Thomas', run by the Sisters of Mercy, and from 1958 to 1970 was a convent. In 1984 the home was sold and again became a private residence. The building has a Historic Place Category 2 listing from Heritage New Zealand, being notable as "an elegant late Victorian house". It is also thought to be the first house in the area to run on electricity. A concrete generator building that supplied the house with electricity is also heritage-listed.

=== Gurudwara Sahib ===
In 2015 the Sikh community bought a former New World supermarket at Vogel Street in Naenae, for use as a gurudwara (place of worship). After alterations and earthquake strengthening, the building was officially opened on 6 November 2016. Golden domes on the temple were imported from India.

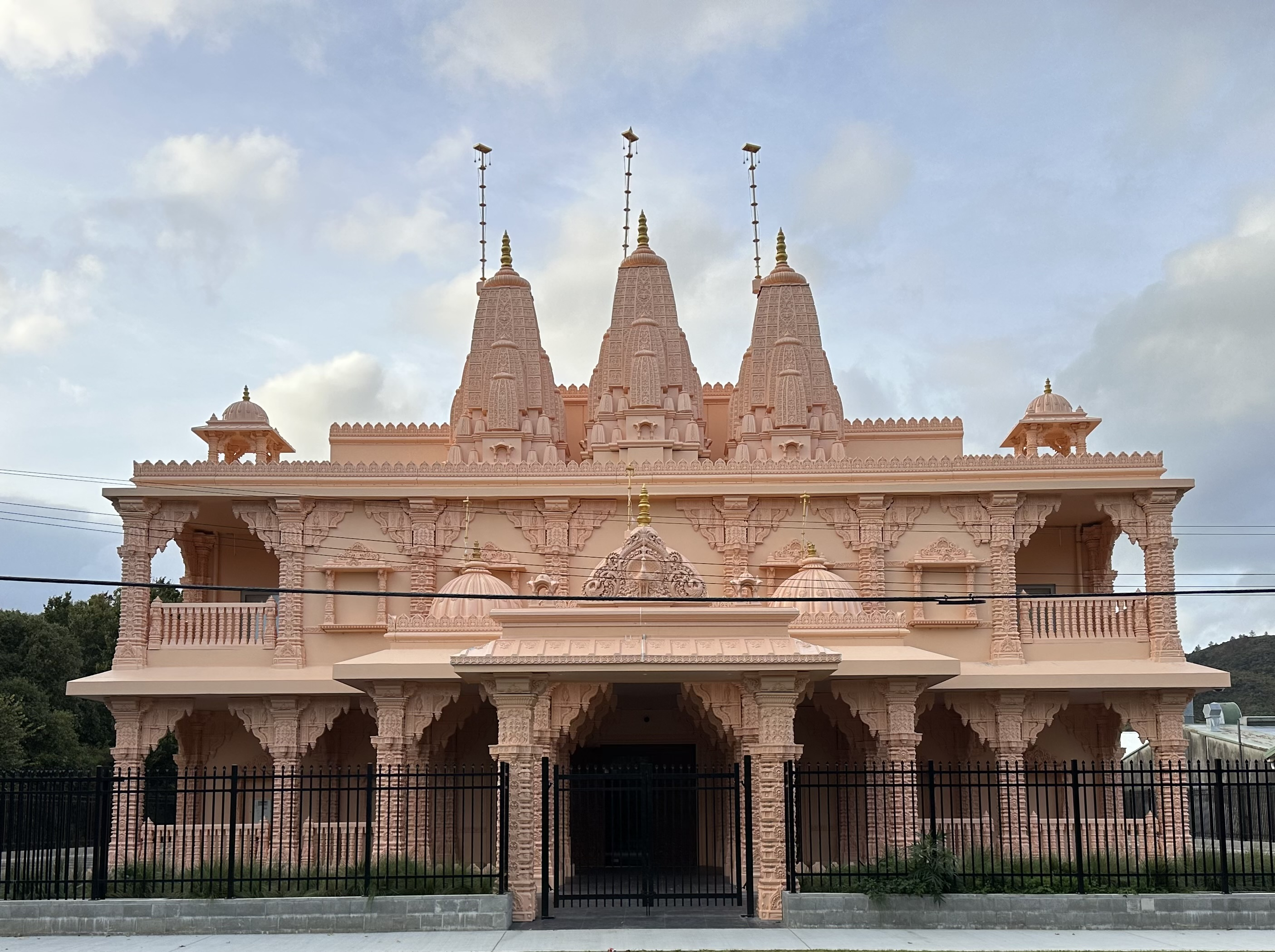
BAPS Shri Swaminarayan Mandir

=== BAPS Shri Swaminarayan Mandir ===
In 2021 a building consent application was lodged for a BAPS Hindu temple at 226 Cambridge Terrace, on the site of a former pharmaceutical distribution warehouse. Construction began in March 2023. The new building is constructed of concrete, with decorative elements imported from India. It covers 3700 square metres and includes a prayer hall, auditorium, learning centre, dining hall and commercial kitchen. The temple officially opened on 10 August 2025 after five days of celebration.

=== Taita Cemetery ===
Taita (or more recently Taitā) Cemetery was the first public cemetery in Lower Hutt. It opened in 1892, before the town of Naenae developed, hence its name. The cemetery is divided into two parts: the 'Old Monumental Cemetery' and a newer section opened in 1952 called 'Taitā Lawn Cemetery'. Kowhai Street in Naenae was formerly called Cemetery Road.

== Demographics ==
Naenae, comprising the statistical areas of Naenae Central, Naenae North and Naenae South, covers 5.18 km^{2} (2.00 sq mi). It had an estimated population of 9,300 as of June 2025, with a population density of 1,795 people per km^{2}.

Historical population
| Year | Pop. | ±% p.a. |
|---|---|---|
| 2006 | 8,286 | — |
| 2013 | 8,184 | −0.18% |
| 2018 | 8,700 | +1.23% |
| 2023 | 8,739 | +0.09% |

Naenae had a population of 8,739 in the 2023 New Zealand census, an increase of 39 people (0.4%) since the 2018 census, and an increase of 555 people (6.8%) since the 2013 census. There were 4,410 males, 4,284 females, and 42 people of other genders in 3,003 dwellings. 4.1% of people identified as LGBTIQ+. The median age was 34.2 years (compared with 38.1 years nationally). There were 1,863 people (21.3%) aged under 15 years, 1,842 (21.1%) aged 15 to 29, 4,044 (46.3%) aged 30 to 64, and 984 (11.3%) aged 65 or older.

People could identify as more than one ethnicity. The results were 51.0% European (Pākehā); 30.0% Māori; 23.5% Pasifika; 15.0% Asian; 3.0% Middle Eastern, Latin American and African New Zealanders (MELAA); and 1.6% other, which includes people giving their ethnicity as "New Zealander". English was spoken by 93.1%, Māori by 8.4%, Samoan by 9.7%, and other languages by 16.0%. No language could be spoken by 2.7% (e.g. too young to talk). New Zealand Sign Language was known by 1.0%. The percentage of people born overseas was 25.6, compared with 28.8% nationally.

Religious affiliations were 37.6% Christian, 3.1% Hindu, 2.3% Islam, 2.0% Māori religious beliefs, 1.2% Buddhist, 0.5% New Age, and 1.8% other religions. People who answered that they had no religion were 45.0%, and 6.8% of people did not answer the census question.

Of those at least 15 years old, 1,224 (17.8%) people had a bachelor's or higher degree, 3,453 (50.2%) had a post-high school certificate or diploma, and 2,193 (31.9%) people exclusively held high school qualifications. The median income was $36,300, compared with $41,500 nationally. 483 people (7.0%) earned over $100,000 compared to 12.1% nationally. The employment status of those at least 15 was 3,408 (49.6%) full-time, 798 (11.6%) part-time, and 318 (4.6%) unemployed.

Individual statistical areas
| Name | Area (km^{2}) | Population | Density (per km^{2}) | Dwellings | Median age | Median income |
|---|---|---|---|---|---|---|
| Naenae Central | 1.39 | 3,567 | 2,566 | 1,230 | 34.5 years | $35,700 |
| Naenae North | 2.61 | 2,514 | 963 | 870 | 34.3 years | $37,900 |
| Naenae South | 1.18 | 2,655 | 2,250 | 903 | 33.8 years | $35,900 |
| New Zealand | | | | | 38.1 years | $41,500 |

== Education ==
Naenae has four schools:

- Naenae School is a state contributing primary (Year 1–6) school serving the southern half of the suburb. It has 339 students. It opened c. 1950 replacing the temporary Waddington School which had opened in 1946.
- Rātā Street School is a state contributing primary (Year 1–6) school serving the northern half of the suburb. It has 297 students. It opened in 1950.
- St Bernadette's School is a state-integrated Catholic full primary and intermediate (Year 1–8) school. It has 118 students. It opened in 1948.
- Wā Ora Montessori School is a state-integrated Montessori composite (Year 1–13) school. It has 251 students. It opened in 1988.

All these schools are co-educational. Rolls are as of March 2026.

State intermediate students (Year 7–8) and secondary students (Year 9–13) are served by Naenae Intermediate School and Naenae College respectively, which despite their names are located in the adjacent suburb of Avalon.

== Transport ==
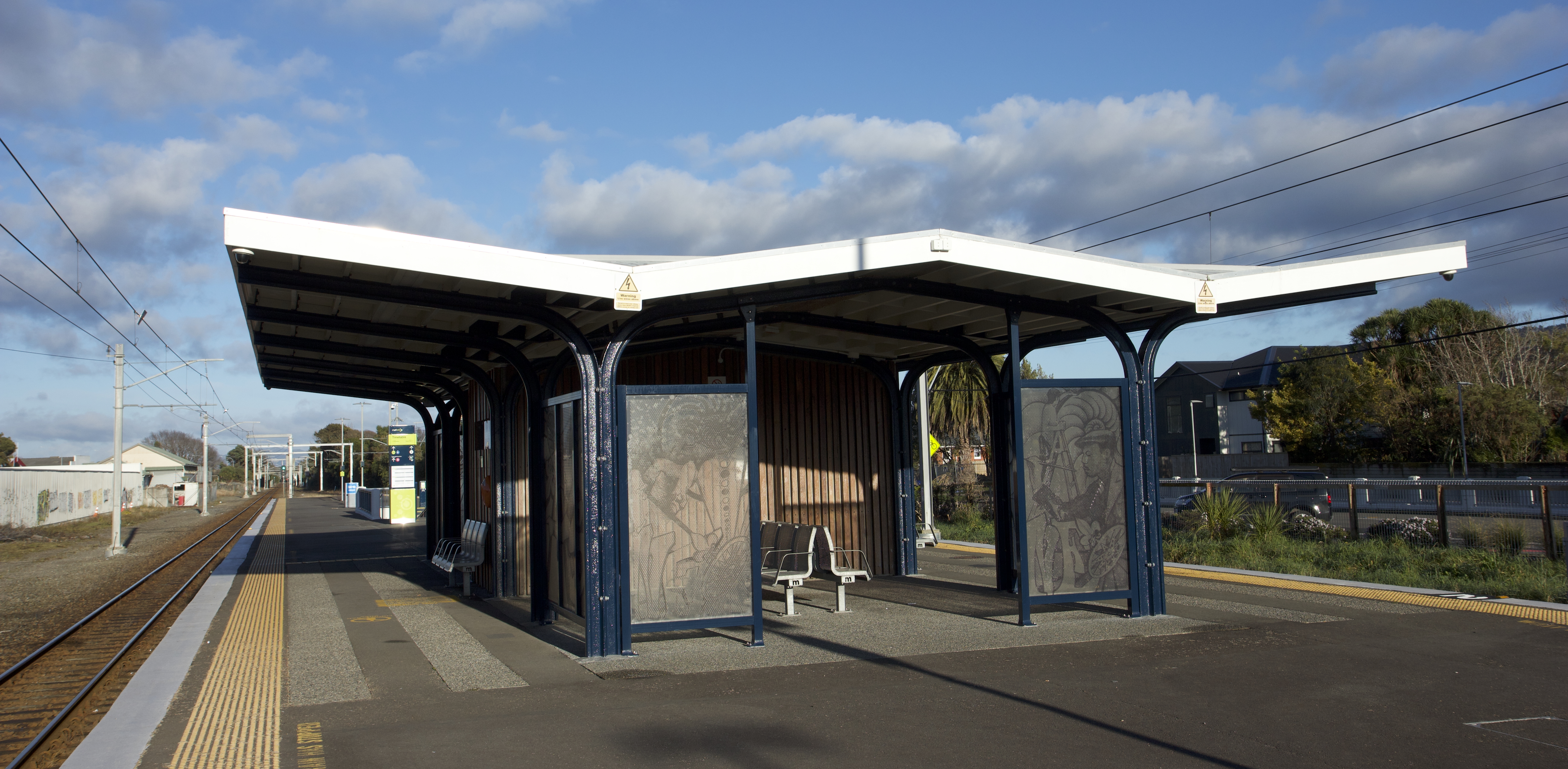
Naenae railway station

Work to extend the Hutt Valley Branch from Waterloo to Naenae began in June 1944 to provide commuter rail services for new areas of major housing development. The route was planned for double-track, but the line was initially opened as single track with the first services commencing on 7 January 1946. The line was further extended to Taitā and opened on 14 April 1947, and the section from Waterloo to Naenae was double tracked. The section from Naenae to Taitā was duplicated on 22 February 1953. In March 1954, Naenae became part of the Wairarapa Line when the Taitā to Haywards (now Manor Park) extension opened and the existing Melling to Haywards line closed. As of 2025, Naenae Station is served by Hutt Valley Line trains running between Upper Hutt and Wellington, but Wairarapa Line trains do not stop at Naenae.

The Naenae railway station, opened in 1946, was closed for three months in 2012 for a major upgrade.

Naenae is also served by two bus routes which provide access to Stokes Valley, Lower Hutt, Petone and Seaview.

== Notable people ==
People who have grown up or lived in Naenae include:

- Paul Adams - property developer
- Andy Anderson - actor
- Asafo Aumua - rugby player
- Julian Dennison - actor
- Shaun Easthope - footballer
- Brooke Fraser - singer
- Monica Galetti - chef
- Billy Graham - boxer
- Bob Jones - businessman
- Stephen Kós - judge of the Supreme Court and President of Court of Appeal
- Colin McColl - theatre director
- Aaron Tokona - guitarist and singer
- Dan Wootton - journalist and broadcaster
