= Taitā railway station =

Railway station in New Zealand

Taitā
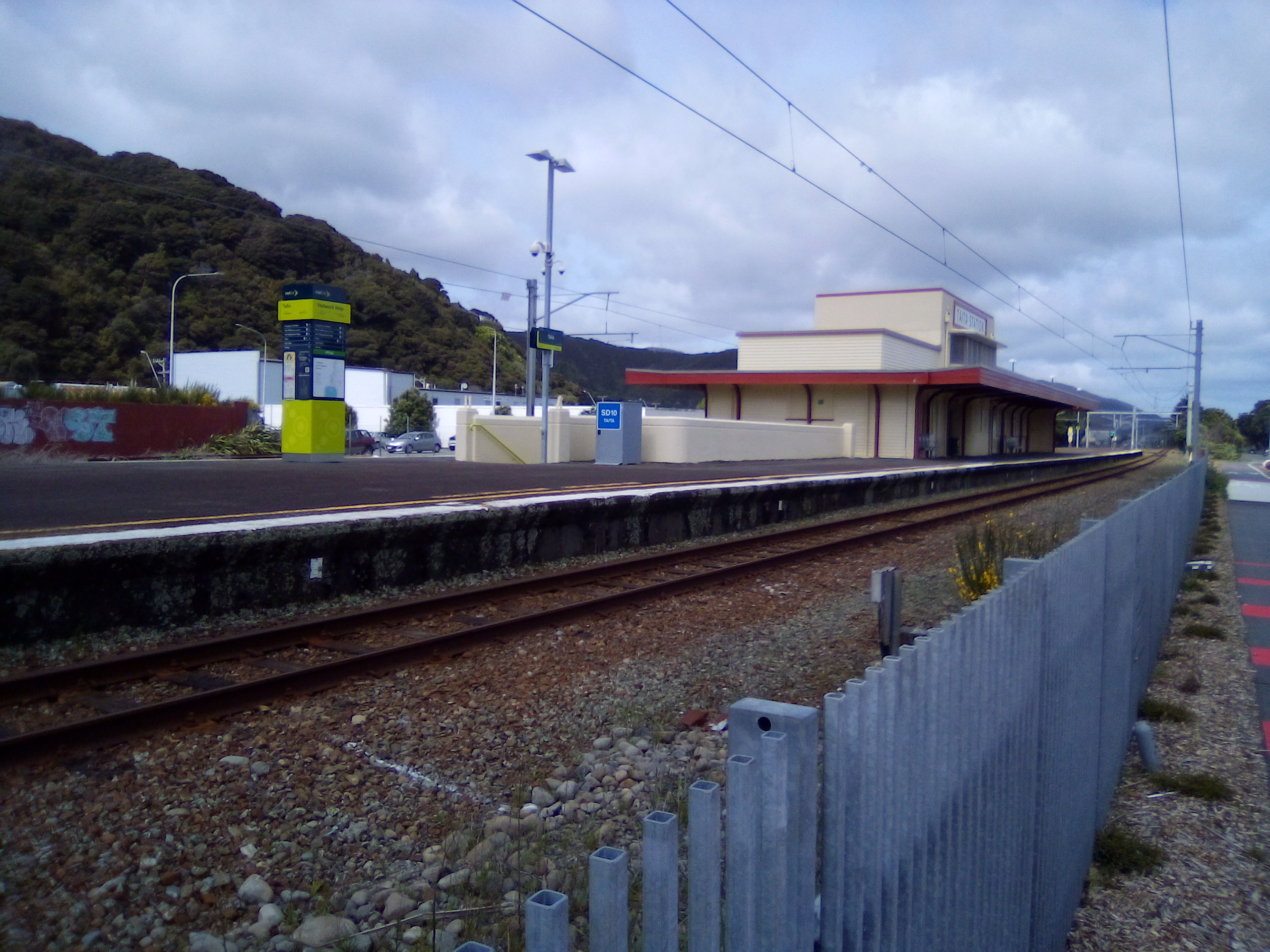
- Taitā station in 2021

General information
- Location: High Street, Taitā, Lower Hutt, New Zealand
- Coordinates: 41°10.832′S 174°57.639′E
- System: Metlink suburban rail
- Owner: Greater Wellington Regional Council
- Line: Wairarapa Line
- Platforms: Island
- Tracks: Main line (2)

Construction
- Parking: Yes

Other information
- Station code: TAIT (Metlink); TTA (KiwiRail)
- Fare zone: 5

History
- Opened: 14 April 1947; 79 years ago
- Electrified: 14 September 1953; 73 years ago

Services
Preceding station	Transdev Wellington	Following station
Pomare towards Upper Hutt	Hutt Valley Line	Wingate towards Wellington
Location

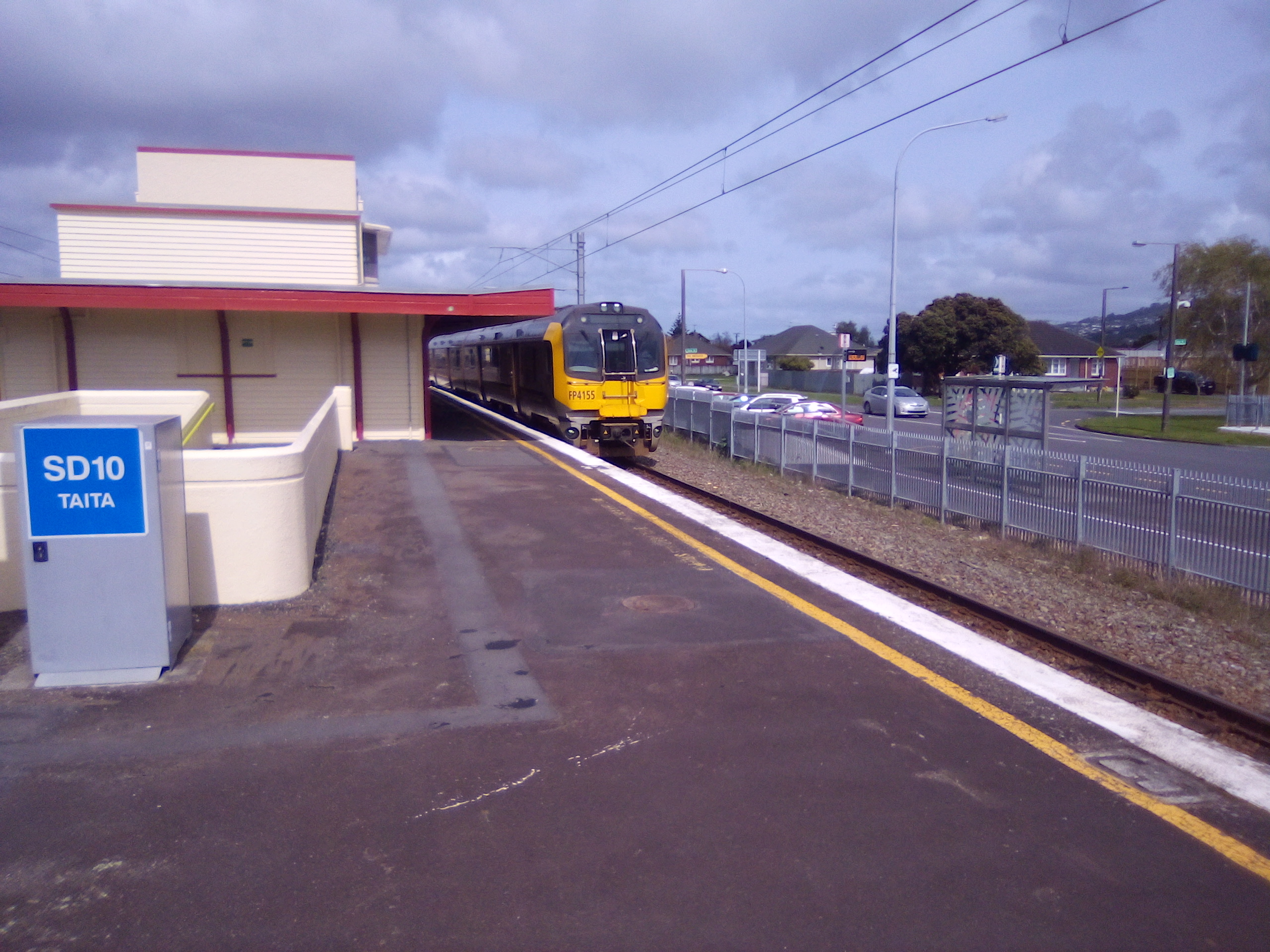
An eastbound train at the station

Taitā railway station is a suburban railway station serving Taitā in Lower Hutt, New Zealand. The station is located on the Hutt Valley section of the Wairarapa Line, 20.6 km (12.8 mi) north of Wellington. The station is served by Metlink's electric multiple unit trains of the "Matangi" FP class.

The station has an island platform between double tracks.

== History ==
Taitā railway station opened on 14 April 1947, when a single-track extension of the then Hutt Valley Branch from Naenae to Taitā (then known as Taita) opened. The station originally only had one platform (the current up platform) in operation; the second platform opened when track was laid in 1952. The double track from Naenae to Taitā opened on 22 February 1953.

On 1 March 1954, Taitā became a through station with the opening of a single track to Haywards (now called Manor Park), and with the closure of the Melling to Haywards line the route via Taitā became the main route to Upper Hutt and the Wairarapa.

The official name of Taitā changed in December 2019 to be spelled with a macron, and the official name of the railway station, gazetted in 1948, was changed to "Taitā Railway Station" on 16 July 2020.

== Services ==
=== Rail ===
Metlink, on behalf of the Greater Wellington Regional Council, operates Hutt Valley Line electric suburban services between Wellington and Upper Hutt via Taitā. The basic daytime off-peak timetable is:

- 2 tph Hutt Valley Line to Wellington, stopping all stations.
- 2 tph Hutt Valley Line to Upper Hutt, stopping all stations.

The basic morning peak timetable is:

- 6 tph Hutt Valley Line to Wellington, split:
  - 3 tph stopping all stations to Petone
  - 3 tph stopping Waterloo only

Taitā station serves as an important median point on peak Hutt Valley Line services. At both morning and evening peaks services commence and terminate at Taitā, stopping at all stations en route to Wellington railway station along the southern section of the Hutt Valley Line. Services along the northern section commencing and terminating at Upper Hutt railway station run express to or from Taitā (stopping only at Waterloo Interchange) and stop at all stations north of Taitā.

To facilitate the movement of commencing and terminating trains, crossover points exist south of the station and a central storage siding exists north of the station. As there is no long-term storage at Taitā, all trains terminating at Taitā must return to Wellington (and vice versa), often running empty and non-stop. Until July 2014, a signal box on the upper level of the station building was responsible for switching the Taitā crossovers during peak-hour operation. Over the weekend of 19–20 July 2014, the signal box was decommissioned and the switching function moved to Train Control in central Wellington.

There are three possible termination and commencement configurations:

- Arrive/depart up platform: if there is sufficient time before the next up train (i.e. from Wellington) is due, the terminating Taitā service will terminate at the up platform. The train then will return to Wellington from the up platform, switching over to the down line through the 77 crossover. This manoeuvre is predominantly used during morning peak, and is available outside signal box hours by operating a switch on the up platform to switch the 77 crossover.
- Arrive/depart down platform: if there is insufficient time before the next up train is due (during evening peak, Taitā terminating services are often closely followed by Upper Hutt expresses), and there is sufficient time before the next down train is due, the terminating Taitā service will switch over to the down line through the 75 crossover (halfway between Taitā and Wingate) and terminate at the down platform. The train then will return to Wellington from the down platform. This manoeuvre is predominantly used during evening peak.
- Arrive up platform, depart down platform: if there is insufficient time before the next up train is due and insufficient time before the next down train is due, the terminating Taitā service will stop at the up platform to disembark passengers, then switch into the central storage siding through crossover 78 to clear the up line for the next up service. Once the next down service has passed through, the train will move to the down platform through crossover 79 to pick up passengers for the return journey. This manoeuvre is used during both peaks.

=== Bus ===
Metlink bus routes 120 and 121 serve Taitā station.
