= Avalon, New Zealand =

Suburb of Lower Hutt, New Zealand

Avalon
- Suburb
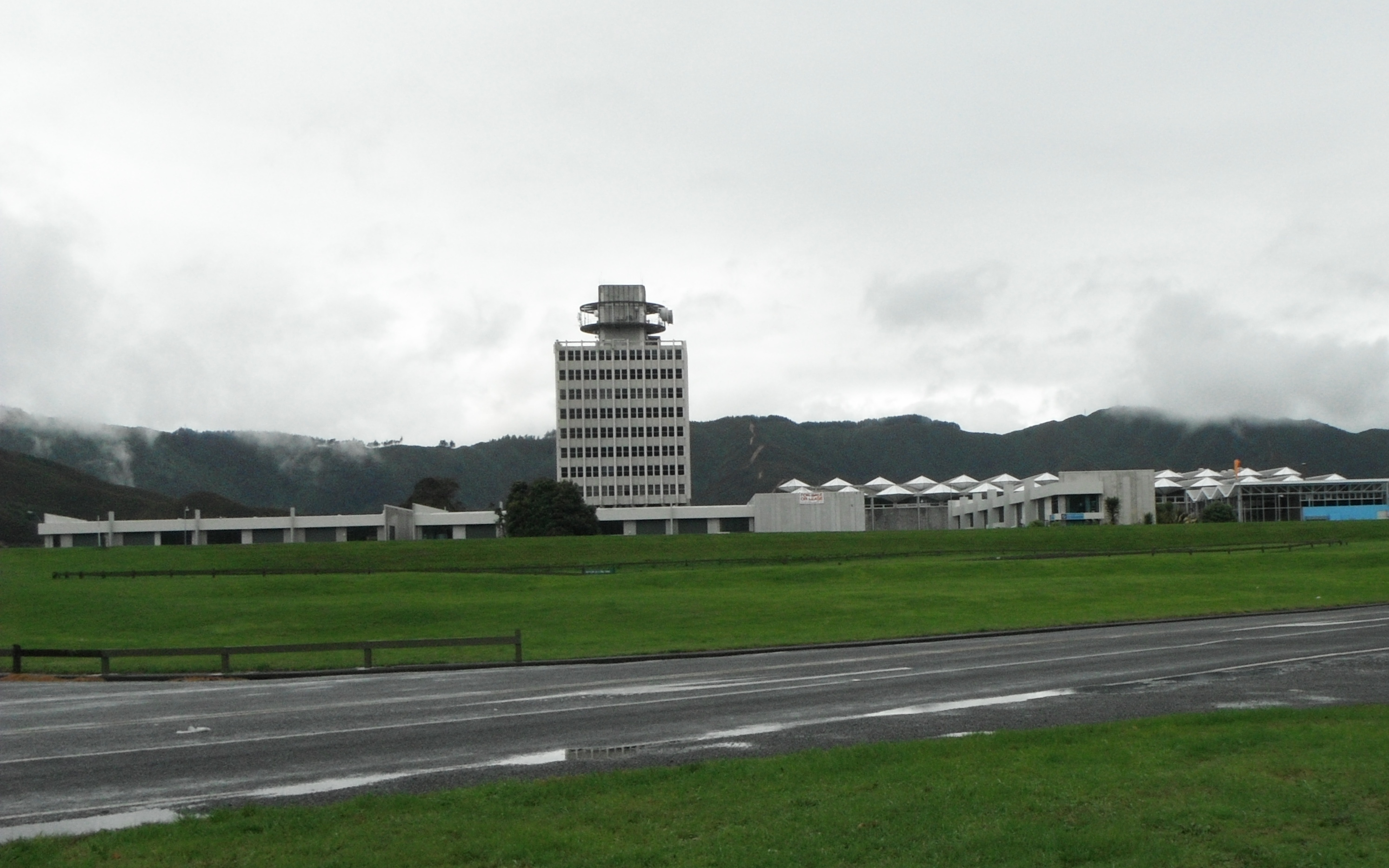
- Avalon Studios
- Interactive map of Avalon
- Coordinates: 41.1931°S 174.9404°E
- Country: New Zealand
- City: Lower Hutt
- Local authority: Hutt City Council
- Electoral ward: Northern

Area
  - Land: 203 ha (500 acres)

Population (June 2025)
  - Total: 5,580
  - Density: 2,750/km^{2} (7,120/sq mi)

| | | Taitā |
| Belmont | Avalon | Wingate |
| Boulcott | Epuni | Naenae |

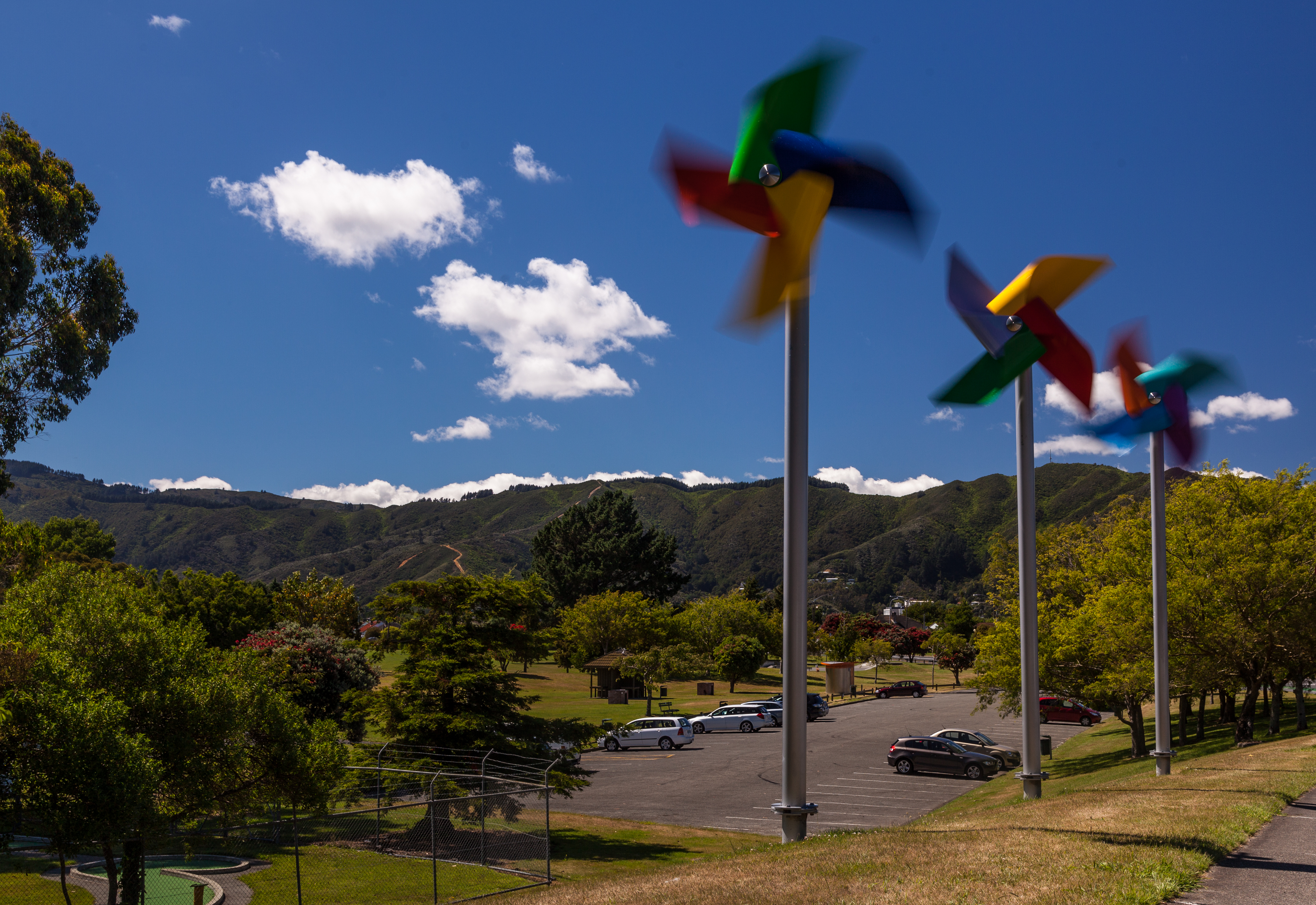
The Smiling Windmills are kinetic sculptures in Avalon Park

Avalon is a suburb of Lower Hutt, in the Wellington Region of New Zealand. It was formed as a private residential development in the 1970s on land formerly occupied by market gardens on the left (eastern) bank of the Hutt River. It features mostly California-inspired designed houses, often split-level, with 3 or 4 bedrooms. It also features Avalon Park, one of the biggest playgrounds in Lower Hutt.

The Hutt City Council formally defines Avalon as the area bounded by Percy Cameron Street and the Wingate Overbridge in the north, the Hutt Valley rail line in the east, Fairway Drive and Daysh Street in the south, and the Hutt River in the west.

== Avalon Studios ==
Avalon came to the attention of most New Zealanders as the early centre of the country's nationwide television-broadcasting production, particularly with the opening of the purpose-built Avalon Studios in 1975. Given that New Zealand started regular public television-broadcasting for the first time in 1960, and instituted networked television in 1969 with only a single (and state-owned) channel available to viewers, the sole provider of television-broadcasting acquired a monopoly position of immense influence within the New Zealand mass media, and the name "Avalon" summarised and expressed that clout for many years.

Avalon also became the focus of New Zealand film-production - through and building on the National Film Unit, which Peter Jackson bought in the late 1990s and incorporated into his Park Road Post facility. Avalon was the filming location for the 2002 television show 100 Hours.

Television New Zealand (founded in 1980) inherited the Avalon real-estate and continued to operate some functions from Avalon, even though its activities mostly moved to Auckland in the course of the 1980s. Avalon produced television-shows such as Good Morning and the New Zealand Lotteries Commission's live Lotto draw.

Avalon Studio comprises two main buildings; a 10-storey tower and a single-story warehouse-style building. The tower is a 10-storey concrete building. The main tower was built in 1975, it was designed in a Soviet-era architecture style. It has 10-storeys with 23,000m2 of floor space, there are also a number of satellites on top. When the tower was first built it dominated the skyline in Lower Hutt City, it is still the tallest building in Avalon.

At the end of 2010 there were rumours the show Good Morning would shift to Auckland, and it was known the contract by the Totalisator Agency Board (TAB) shows Trackside (horse racing) and the Lotto draws was to end in mid-2013. In 2011 TVNZ announced that it would sell off the site for good by 2013 and shift its remaining shows to Auckland, thus consolidating the broadcaster's Auckland focus.

In April 2012 a consortium, Avalon Holdings, bought the Avalon Studios with the expectation of officially taking possession in early 2013. In 2017 the studio facilities were used for filming of the Scarlett Johansson starrer Ghost in the Shell. In March 2019 an application was lodged to transform the 10-storey Avalon Tower into 61 residential units.

== Demographics ==
Avalon, comprising the statistical areas of Avalon West and Avalon East, covers 2.03 km^{2} (0.78 sq mi). It had an estimated population of 5,580 as of June 2025, with a population density of 2,749 people per km^{2}.

Historical population
| Year | Pop. | ±% p.a. |
|---|---|---|
| 2006 | 4,662 | — |
| 2013 | 4,803 | +0.43% |
| 2018 | 5,094 | +1.18% |
| 2023 | 5,247 | +0.59% |

Avalon had a population of 5,247 in the 2023 New Zealand census, an increase of 153 people (3.0%) since the 2018 census, and an increase of 444 people (9.2%) since the 2013 census. There were 2,493 males, 2,730 females, and 24 people of other genders in 2,013 dwellings. 3.0% of people identified as LGBTIQ+. The median age was 40.9 years (compared with 38.1 years nationally). There were 912 people (17.4%) aged under 15 years, 885 (16.9%) aged 15 to 29, 2,301 (43.9%) aged 30 to 64, and 1,149 (21.9%) aged 65 or older.

People could identify as more than one ethnicity. The results were 54.3% European (Pākehā); 15.8% Māori; 15.1% Pasifika; 26.4% Asian; 3.0% Middle Eastern, Latin American and African New Zealanders (MELAA); and 1.7% other, which includes people giving their ethnicity as "New Zealander". English was spoken by 93.7%, Māori by 4.5%, Samoan by 5.8%, and other languages by 24.1%. No language could be spoken by 2.2% (e.g. too young to talk). New Zealand Sign Language was known by 0.6%. The percentage of people born overseas was 33.0, compared with 28.8% nationally.

Religious affiliations were 38.9% Christian, 7.4% Hindu, 2.1% Islam, 0.6% Māori religious beliefs, 1.3% Buddhist, 0.4% New Age, 0.2% Jewish, and 1.7% other religions. People who answered that they had no religion were 41.6%, and 5.8% of people did not answer the census question.

Of those at least 15 years old, 1,104 (25.5%) people had a bachelor's or higher degree, 1,998 (46.1%) had a post-high school certificate or diploma, and 1,239 (28.6%) people exclusively held high school qualifications. The median income was $39,800, compared with $41,500 nationally. 474 people (10.9%) earned over $100,000 compared to 12.1% nationally. The employment status of those at least 15 was 2,085 (48.1%) full-time, 444 (10.2%) part-time, and 138 (3.2%) unemployed.

Individual statistical areas
| Name | Area (km^{2}) | Population | Density (per km^{2}) | Dwellings | Median age | Median income |
|---|---|---|---|---|---|---|
| Avalon West | 1.21 | 2,778 | 2,296 | 1,068 | 45.9 years | $38,800 |
| Avalon East | 0.81 | 2,469 | 3.048 | 945 | 36.1 years | $41,200 |
| New Zealand | | | | | 38.1 years | $41,500 |

== Education ==
Avalon has five schools.

- Avalon Intermediate School is a state intermediate (Year 7–8) school, and has 172 students. It opened in 1865 as Taita School, and was renamed Taita South in 1946. In 1956, it became Taita Intermediate School. It later became Avalon Intermediate.
- Avalon School, also called Te Kura Tuatahi o Motutawa, is a state contributing primary (Year 1–6) school, and has 218 students. It organised a 40th anniversary reunion in 1996.
- Kimi Ora School is a state special school for students with physical disabilities, and has 137 students. It shares grounds with Naenae College, but has its own entrance.
- Naenae College is a state secondary (Year 9–13) school, and has 871 students. The school opened in 1953.
- Naenae Intermediate School is a state intermediate (Year 7–8) school, and has 295 students. It was open by 1956.

All these schools are co-educational. Rolls are as of July 2026.

== Climate ==
Climate data for Lower Hutt (Avalon) (1981–2010)
| Month | Jan | Feb | Mar | Apr | May | Jun | Jul | Aug | Sep | Oct | Nov | Dec | Year |
|---|---|---|---|---|---|---|---|---|---|---|---|---|---|
| Mean daily maximum °C (°F) | 21.6 (70.9) | 22.0 (71.6) | 20.4 (68.7) | 17.7 (63.9) | 15.3 (59.5) | 13.1 (55.6) | 12.4 (54.3) | 13.2 (55.8) | 14.9 (58.8) | 16.0 (60.8) | 17.7 (63.9) | 19.8 (67.6) | 17.0 (62.6) |
| Daily mean °C (°F) | 17.6 (63.7) | 17.7 (63.9) | 16.1 (61.0) | 13.6 (56.5) | 11.7 (53.1) | 9.7 (49.5) | 8.8 (47.8) | 9.4 (48.9) | 11.1 (52.0) | 12.4 (54.3) | 14.0 (57.2) | 16.0 (60.8) | 13.2 (55.7) |
| Mean daily minimum °C (°F) | 13.6 (56.5) | 13.4 (56.1) | 11.9 (53.4) | 9.4 (48.9) | 8.1 (46.6) | 6.2 (43.2) | 5.2 (41.4) | 5.7 (42.3) | 7.4 (45.3) | 8.8 (47.8) | 10.2 (50.4) | 12.3 (54.1) | 9.4 (48.8) |
| Average rainfall mm (inches) | 76.3 (3.00) | 61.3 (2.41) | 121.2 (4.77) | 89.6 (3.53) | 131.1 (5.16) | 132.7 (5.22) | 132.8 (5.23) | 107.2 (4.22) | 78.8 (3.10) | 103.7 (4.08) | 108.6 (4.28) | 93.9 (3.70) | 1,237.2 (48.7) |
Source: NIWA
