= Tales from Te Papa =

- Directed by: Thomas Robins
- Presented by: Riria Hotere, Simon Morton
- Country of origin: New Zealand
- Original language: English
- No. of seasons: 2
- No. of episodes: 100 (list of episodes)

Production
- Producer: Gibson Group

Original release
- Network: TVNZ6

Tales From Te Papa is a television series of mini-documentaries about objects from the collection of the Museum of New Zealand Te Papa Tongarewa (Te Papa) and the activities of the Museum staff. The series is a partnership between Television New Zealand and the Museum of New Zealand Te Papa Tongarewa. The series was commissioned by Television New Zealand for TVNZ6, a digital channel and New Zealand's first fully public service broadcasting channel without advertising breaks. Each episode runs for 5 to 8 minutes and shows on rotation in what would be the advertising break between programmes. Since TVNZ6 changed format to TVNZU on 1 March 2011 the series was moved to TVNZ7 and now available on You Tube.

The series was made by the Gibson Group and each episode produced by Gary Scott and hosted by either Simon Morton or Riria Hotere. A host interviews subject experts about a particular object or the behind-the-scenes work the Museum does.

== Series 2009 Episodes 1 – 50 ==
Episode Number	Title and link to episode on YouTube	Origin	Object Date	Description	Te Papa's Collections online link	Host and additional contributors
1	Cloud by John Reynolds	New Zealand	2006	An artwork made up of over 7,000 separate canvases of New Zealand English by John Reynolds	Cloud by John Reynolds	Simon Morton & Charlotte Huddleston, Curator
2	Hei Tiki	New Zealand	Unknown	Jade Pedant (Hei-tiki) belonging to Guide Sophia	Hei tiki	Simon Morton & Dr Huhana Smith, Senior Curator
3	Kahu Kuri	New Zealand	1500–1800	Polynesian Dog skin cloaks worn by Māori	Cloak and Taxidermied Polynesian Dog (Kurī)	Simon Morton & Awhina Tamarapa, Curator
4	Rugby Ball and John Minto	New Zealand	1956 and 1981	Rugby History in New Zealand – The rugby ball from the All Blacks Series win against the Springboks in 1956 and a helmet of John Minto, protester of the Springbok Tour 1981	Rugby Ball and John Minto's Helmet	Simon Morton & Kirstie Ross, Curator
5	Albatross	New Zealand	1880s to present	Biggest collection of Albatross birds in the world	Albatross specimens	Simon Morton & Sandy Bartle, Curator
6	Beaked Whales	New Zealand waters	1874 to present	Largest collection of Beaked whale skeletons in the world and the Spade toothed whale	Beaked Whale Specimens	Simon Morton & Anton van Helden, Collection Manager
7	Giant Ammonite	New Zealand	Jurassic	Biggest Shellfish ever found in New Zealand (fossil or alive)	Not found in Collections Online	Riria Hotere & Dr Hamish Campbell, Geologist, GNS Science
8	Puffer Fish Helmet	Kiribiti	1800s	Armour and weapons from Kiribati	Puffer Fish Helmet and model Kiribati Warrior and Sting ray belt and Hand weapon (Rere) and Amour	Riria Hotere & Sean Mallon, Senior Curator
9	Fijian War Clubs	Fiji	1880s	Lots of war clubs from Fiji	Fijian War Clubs Model of Fijian Warrior	Riria Hotere & Sean Mallon, Senior Curator
10	Angel of the Annunciation by Colin McCahon	New Zealand	1947	One of New Zealand's greatest artists – Colin McCahon and his early works	Angel of the Annunciation and King of the Jews and Entombment: after Titian and Christ taken from the Cross and The valley of dry bones	Riria Hotere & William McAloon, Curator
11	Castaway Clothes	Sub-Antarctic Islands	1880s-1900s	Castaway depots on Sub-Antarctic Islands	Tin of Ships Biscuits and Castaway three piece suit and Box containing men's boots and Castaway's Trousers	Riria Hotere & Michael Fitzgerald, Curator
12	Iguanodon Tooth	Great Britain	1820	The first fossil to be recognised as from a dinosaur	Fossil Iguanodon Tooth and The country of the Iguanodon by John Martin	Riria Hotere & Dr Hamish Campbell, Geologist, GNS Science
13	Synotaxid spiders	New Zealand	Present	Thousands of Spiders waiting to be discovered in New Zealand	Synotaxid Spiders	Riria Hotere & Phil Sirvid, Collection Manager
14	Egyptian Mummy	Egypt	circa 300 BC	Egyptian Mummy and Sarcophagus – Mehit-em-Wesekht	Mummy and Sarcophagus of Mehit-em-Wesekht	Riria Hotere & Ross O'Rourke, Collection Manager
15	Pisupo Lua Afe (Corned Beef 2000) by Michel Tuffery	New Zealand	1994	Sculpture made of corned beef tins by Michel Tuffery	Pisupo Lau Afe (Corned Beef 2000)	Riria Hotere & Sean Mallon, Senior Curator
16	Poi Awe	New Zealand	1800s	The only Poi awe in Te Papa's collection	The Poi Awe	Riria Hotere & Awhina Tamarapa, Curator
17	Feather signatures	New Zealand	Present	Research into the making of Māori feather cloaks	Feathered cloak	Riria Hotere & Hokimate Harwood, Bicultural Researcher
18	Waka Whakairo from Paris	New Zealand	1800–1900	Carving purchased at a Paris auction in 2008	Waka whakairo	Riria Hotere & Matiu Baker, Curator
19	Lisa Reihana	New Zealand	2009	Te Ara a Hine – The pathway of women featuring the artwork Mai i te aroha, ko te aroha by Lisa Reihana	Work by Lisa Reihana in Te Papa's Collection	Riria Hotere & Megan Tamati-Quennell, Curator
20	Jewellery by Jane Dodd	New Zealand	2006	Three Little Pigs jewellery by Jane Dodd	Work by Jane Dodd in Te Papa's Collection	Riria Hotere & Justine Olsen, Curator
21	Glass plate negatives taken by James Bragge	New Zealand	1870s – 1880s	Glass plate negatives by James Bragge	Work by James Bragge in Te Papa's Collection and Five Mile Avenue, Forty Mile Bush by James Bragge	Riria Hotere & Athol McCredie, Curator
22	Land Girls, Overalls and Killing Knife	New Zealand	1941–1945	The New Zealand Women's Land Service & the home front	Overalls and Killing knife	Riria Hotere & Stephanie Gibson, Curator
23	Bathing costumes	New Zealand	1902–1912	Beach Fashion – The Swimsuit	Bathing costume, 1912 and "The sea hath its pearls": 'Boxing Day at Hokio, 26 December 1918'. From the album: Family photograph album, by Leslie Adkin and Bathing Costume and medal belonging to Noel Crump	Riria Hotere & Kirstie Ross, Curator
24	Ta Moko Panel	New Zealand	1896	Carved panel by Tene Waitere	Ta Moko Panel	Riria Hotere & Arapata Hakiwai, Curator & James Schuster, Descendent
25	Dental Nurse Equipment	New Zealand	1940s	Dentistry in New Zealand and Dental nurses	Dental equipment from the Wellington Dental Nursing School	Simon Morton & Kirstie Ross, Curator
26	Sextant	Motuihe Island, New Zealand	1916	Sextant made from scratch by a German Prisoner of War during World War One used by Count von Luckner	Sextant used by Count von Luckner during his escape attempt from Motuihe Island	Simon Morton & Michael Fitzgerald, Curator
27	Te Papa's Fish Collection labs	New Zealand	2009	A giant morgue and an autopsy room for fish, sharks and sea creatures	Fish specimens in Collections Online	Simon Morton & Andrew Stewart, Collection Manager
28	Replica Crown Jewels	New Zealand	1940	Replica Crown Jewels and the New Zealand Centennial Exhibition 1940	Items relating to the New Zealand Centennial Exhibition 1940	Simon Morton & Dean Miller, Museum of Wellington City & Sea & Kirstie Ross, Curator
29	Henry Fanshaw Bear	New Zealand	1939–1945	The Royal New Zealand Airforce – enlisting men and a Teddy bear	War posters in Te Papa's Collection	Simon Morton & Stephanie Gibson, Curator & Steve Moore, Air Commodore
30	Samoan Cricket Bats	Samoa	1936 – 1990s	Kilikiti- Cricket Samoan Style	Samoan Cricket bats	Simon Morton & Safua Akeli, Curator
31	Society Islands Chief Mourners Costume	Society Islands	1770s	A frightening outfit made from precious pearl and black shell from the Society Islands	Chief Mourners Costume	Simon Morton & Grace Hutton, Collection Manager
32	NZ Company Flag	New Zealand	1839	First flag to be raised at Wellington, New Zealand – The New Zealand Company flag	New Zealand Company flag	Riria Hotere & Michael Fitzgerald, Curator
33	The pataka Te Takinga	New Zealand	1850s	The pataka Te Takinga	Not Found in Collections Online	Riria Hotere & Awhina Tamarapa, Curator & Sam Jackson, Kaumatua Ngati Pikiao, Taranaki
34	Banks and Solander Collection	New Zealand	1770s	The earliest specimens of New Zealand flora collected by Joseph Banks and Daniel Solander	The Banks and Solander botanical specimens collection	Riria Hotere & Dr Patrick Brownsey, Senior Curator
35	Scottish Samplers	Scotland	1880s	Learning a range of stitching by creating sewing samplers	Sampler by Jeanie Lawson and Sampler by Agnes Lawson and Sampler by Agnes Lawson	Simon Morton & Stephanie Gibson, Curator
36	Play School Toys	New Zealand	1970s	Toys from the popular children's television programme Play School	Big Ted and Jemima and Manu and Humpty and Play School doll's clothes	Riria Hotere & Kirstie Ross, Curator
37	Phar Lap's Skeleton	New Zealand	1932	Famous Australasian racehorse Phar Lap's Skeleton	Skeleton of Phar Lap	Simon Morton & Chris Paulin, Phar Lap Researcher
38	Tapa Cloth	Pacific	Various	Tapa cloth and fashion	Tiputa (Poncho) and Wedding costume by Paula Chan-Cheuk	Riria Hotere & Safua Akeli, Curator & Jakki Leota-Ete
39	Vita Dress	New Zealand	2000	Women's handcrafts and fashion combine in a stunning dress by Marilyn Sainty and Vita Cochran.	'Vita' dress by Marilyn Sainty and Vita Cochran and 'Zip Bag' by Vita Cochran	Simon Morton & Angela Lassig, Senior Curator
40	Mary-Annette Hay	New Zealand	1960s	Mary-Annette Hay – Queen of Wool	Items in Te Papa's collection associated with Mary-Annette Hay	Simon Morton & Angela Lassig, Senior Curator
41	Extended Depth of Field Photography	New Zealand	2009	High Tech photography known as Focus stacking of tiny natural history specimens	Photographs of spiders taken using extended depth of field photography technique	Simon Morton & Jean-Claude Stahl, Researcher
42	Deep sea fishes	New Zealand Territorial Waters	20th Century	Bizarre Deep Sea Fishes	Te Papa's Fish Collection	Simon Morton & Andrew Stewart, Collection Manager
43	Conservation of Samurai Armour	Japan	1735	Conservation Treatment of Samurai Armour – A two-year job	Samurai armour (Sendai-do no Gusoku) made by Muneyoshi of the House of Myouchin	Simon Morton & Rose Evans, Conservator
44	Ceramics by Ann Verdcourt	New Zealand	1991	Ceramics by Ann Verdcourt inspired by the voyage of Christopher Columbus and commissioned for Expo 92	Series one: Columbus plans his first voyage, sailing against the wind and Series two: The trials and tribulations of the first voyage and Series three: A new land, its perils, its wonder	Riria Hotere & Justine Olsen, Curator
45	Tatua	New Zealand	2007-08	Tatua (Maori belts) made by Matthew McIntyre-Wilson	Tatua (Maori belts)	Riria Hotere & Dr Huhana Smith, Senior Curator
46	Child's Wrap	Wairarapa	circa 1875	Child's Cloak made by Eterina Hokokakahu Aperahama	Not Found in Collections Online	Riria Hotere & Matiu Baker, Curator & Warren Wright, Descendant
47	A Loss, Again – a temporary sculpture installation at Te Papa	New Zealand	2009	Temporary sculpture by artist Ronnie van Hout	Other works by Ronnie van Hout in Te Papa's collection	Riria Hotere & Charlotte Huddleston, Curator
48	Tuvalu Clothes	Tuvalu	circa 1900	Missionary style clothes made from local materials in Tuvalu	Man's Jacket and Man's Hat and Woman's Dress	Riria Hotere & Sean Mallon, Senior Curator
49	Harata Rewiri Tarapata	New Zealand	1903-04	C.F.Goldie's paintings of Harata Rewiri Tarapata	Items related to Harata Rewiri Tarapata in Te Papa's collection	Riria Hotere & Scott Pothan, Whangarei Art Museum
50	Von Tempsky	New Zealand	1860s	Gustavus Ferdinand Von Tempsky – adventurer, artist and soldier	Items related to Von Tempsky in Te Papa's collection	Simon Morton & Crystal Mann, Waikato Museum

== Series 2010 Episodes 51 – 100 ==
Episode Number	Title & Link to Episode on YouTube	Origin	Date	Description	Te Papa's Collections Online link	Host & Additional contributors
51	The Feathered Face of War	Hawai'i	1779-1790s	A representation of the Hawaiian war god Kuka	`aumakua hulu manu Kuka`ilimoku (feathered image)	Simon Morton & Herman Pi'ikea Clark, Hawaiian Specialist
52	A Captain's Chiefly Gift	Hawai'i	1779	Gifts of Hawaiians to Captain James Cook in 1779	`ahu `ula (Feathered cloak) and Mahiole	Simon Morton & Herman Pi'ikea Clark, Hawaiian Specialist
53	Beaded Beauties	New Zealand	1920s	Beaded flapper dresses	Gold and black flapper dress Others not found in Collections Online	Simon Morton & Angela Lassig, Senior Curator
54	Whale's Treasure	New Zealand	2009	Ambergris from Sperm whale	Not found in Collections Online	Simon Morton & Anton Van Helden, Collection Manager
55	Designer Walls	New Zealand	1920-1970s	Historic wallpaper samples	Wallpaper samples	Simon Morton & Anna Greaves, Wallpaper expert & Phillipa Durkin, Conservator
56	Nature's Hitchhikers	New Zealand	2009	All warm blooded animals have lice – Te Papa collects Bird lice	Lice	Simon Morton & Ricardo Palma, Curator
57	The Art of Fish Illustration	New Zealand	2009	The Art of Fish Illustration for scientific journals	Not found in Collections Online	Riria Hotere & Michelle Freeborn, Scientific Illustrator
58	Lavender – Nice Smell, Bad Idea	New Zealand	2009	Lavender bags and the Oddy test	Not found in Collections Online	Riria Hotere & Tony Clarke, Conservator
59	Waddling Mice & Kiwi Crocs	New Zealand	20 million BC	Intriguing fossils from St Bathans in Otago, New Zealand	Specimens of fossilised bone	Riria Hotere & Alan Tennyson, Curator
60	The Cleaners	New Zealand	2009	Dermestid beetles – flesh eaters and bone specimen cleaners	Tuatara skull preparation	Riria Hotere & Catherine Tate, Natural Environment Technician
61	A Soldier's Doll	New Zealand	1914–1918	Keeping her soldier boyfriend close to her heart	Dorothy Broad's dolls and work	Simon Morton & Kirstie Ross, Curator
62	Musket – Flash in the Pan	New Zealand	1840s	The New Zealand Wars and muskets	Flintlock Muskets	Simon Morton & Michael Fitzgerald, Curator
63	Cox's Diary from the Front	Gallipoli	1915	A Gallipoli Diary from a New Zealand soldier	The Diary	Simon Morton & Jennifer Twist, Archivist
64	Painter's Nightmare	New Zealand	2009	What do paintings conservators do?	Northland panels, 1958 by Colin McCahon	Riria Hotere & Melanie Carlisle, Conservator & Katherine Campbell, Conservator
65	Crayfish – Crazy Life Cycle	New Zealand	Current	The life cycle of the Rock lobster	Not found in Collections Online	Riria Hotere & Rick Webber, Curator
66	A Portrait for All Times	United States of America	1771	A memory of a mother in a painting	Mrs Humphrey Devereux by John Singleton Copley	Riria Hotere & Tony Mackle, Collection Manager
67	One Coast – Two Views	Cook Strait, New Zealand	1884	An insight into Nicholas Chevalier's painting of Cook Strait.	Cook Strait, New Zealand by Nicholas Chevalier, Near Paekakariki, Cook Strait by Nicholas Chevalier, Kapiti by Nicholas Chevalier	Simon Morton & Tony Mackle, Collection Manager
68	Frame Detective – A case of woodworm	New Zealand	2009	Researching and reuniting a picture frame with its artwork	Death of a peasant by Henry Lamb	Riria Hotere & Matthew O'Reilly, Framer
69	Seaweed – More than Meets the Eye	New Zealand	Current	Seaweed in your chocolate milk	Seaweeds by taxa and Botanical drawings of seaweed by Nancy Adams	Simon Morton & Jennifer Dalen, Collection Manager
70	Nuclear Nic-Nacs	Japan	1945	Keepsakes from Ground Zero at Hiroshima	Money box and related objects	Riria Hotere & Stephanie Gibson, Curator
71	Cloak of Protection	New Zealand	1840	How a cloak saved the life of a young boy in colonial New Zealand	Not found in Collections Online	Simon Morton & Awhina Tamarapa, Curator
72	Burn My Head in Heaven, by John Pule	New Zealand	1998	Artwork by John Pule	Burn My Head In Heaven, 1998 by John Pule	Simon Morton & Megan Tamati-Quennell, Curator
73	Cool Photos	New Zealand	2009	How a Museum looks after negatives	Autochromes by Robert Walrond Cliffs near Green Island by Burton Bros	Riria Hotere & Lissa Mitchell, Collection Manager
74	Sacred Masks	Papua New Guinea	1900s	Eharo dance masks from Papua New Guinea	Images of Eharo dance masks	Riria Hotere & Safua Akeli, Curator
75	Ancient Island Carvings	Chatham Islands	Unknown	Chatham Islands carvings by the Moriori	Not found in Collections Online.	Riria Hotere & Arapata Hakiwai, Curator & Mana Cracknell, Artist and Elder
76	Coming of Age Treasures	New Zealand	1935 & 1942	Turning 21 and coming of age parties	Chocolate Box	Riria Hotere & Stephanie Gibson, Curator
77	A Cape of Stars	New Zealand	2006	A cape of celebration	Matariki Caper by Kohai Grace	Riria Hotere & Kohai Grace, artist & Awhina Tamarapa, Curator
78	The Ocean's Tight Five	New Zealand	modern	Echinoderm – Marine Animals	Not found in Collections Online	Simon Morton & Rick Webber, Curator
79	Ruby's Room	New Zealand	2000	Photographs by Ann Noble	Works from the series Ruby's Room by Ann Noble	Riria Hotere & Athol McCredie, Curator
80	Picture Perfect Dolls	New Zealand	1920s-1930s	Dolls made by Bessie Murray	Dolls by Bessie Murray Darby and Joan (Ina Te Papatahi, Nga Puhi) by C. F. Goldie	Riria Hotere & Stephanie Gibson, Curator
81	Stories Sewn in Quilts	Cook Islands	circa 1990	Tivaevae – Pacific quilts	Tivaevae called Ina and the shark and other Tivaevae	Riria Hotere & Grace Hutton, Collection Manager
82	A Soldier's Christmas	North Africa	1941	A Kiwi soldier in World War II	Image of Sig (Cyril) Hurne-Miller, the artist’s batman by Peter McIntyre. Christmas Card not found in Collections Online.	Riria Hotere & Michael Fitzgerald, Curator
83	A Chiefly Sword	New Zealand	1848	Te Rauparaha's Sword – A symbol of peace	Sword not found in Collections Online. Painting of Te Rauparaha in naval uniform Image of Rangiatea Church	Riria Hotere & Te Waari Carkeek, Ngati Toa, Ngati Raukawa
84	Carved in Skin	New Zealand	1840	The significance of Ta Moko (Maori facial tattooing) today	Life Mask Image of Moko being created	Simon Morton & Mark Kopua, Ta Moko Artist
85	A Powerful Peacemaker	New Zealand	1819	The peacemaking Taiaha named Te Rongotaketake from the early colonial period	Not found in Collections Online	Riria Hotere & Matiu Baker, Curator
86	Carving Family History	New Zealand	Modern	Learning to make Tokelauan Toki (Adzes)	The set of Toki	Riria Hotere & Kupa Kupa, Adze maker & Jack Kirifi, Adze Maker
87	Tatau – Samoan Tattooing	Samoa	Current	Tatau in New Zealand	Tatau implements and images	Riria Hotere & Sean Mallon, Senior Curator
88	Sister's Secret Stash	Wellington, New Zealand	1870s	What childhood treasures were hidden in the walls of Randall Cottage?	Items from Randall Cottage	Riria Hotere & Lynette Townsend, Curator
89	Punch & Judy Kiwi Style	New Zealand	1970s	Punch and Judy in 1970s New Zealand	Puppets by Garth Frost	Riria Hotere & Lynette Townsend, Curator
90		New Zealand	1995	What caught the imagination of Xenites about Xena: Warrior Princess	Xena's Outfit	Riria Hotere & Anna Greaves, Xenite
91	Recycled Plastic Art	New Zealand	Current	Recycling plastic as art – Good for the environment but not good for conservators	Items made from plastic in the Pacific Collections	Riria Hotere & Nirmala Balram, Conservator
92	The Art of Haka	New Zealand	1962	A colourful version of the haka Ka Mate, Ka Mate on canvas	Whiti te ra, 1962 by Paratene Matchitt	Riria Hotere & Megan Tamati-Quennell, Curator
93	3D Photography	New Zealand	Current	3D photography at Te Papa	Not found in Collections Online	Riria Hotere & Norm Heke, Photographer
94		New Zealand	1867–1946	George Hudson's insect collection	George Vernon Hudson	Simon Morton & George Gibbs, George Hudson's grandson
95	Letter No. 1.	New Zealand	1831	Earliest surviving letter addressed to New Zealand	Not found in Collections Online	Simon Morton & Dr Patrick Brownsey, Senior Curator
96	Who Killed the Huia?	New Zealand	1904	Was Walter Buller a prime suspect?	Huia specimens Portrait of Walter Buller by Ethel Mortlock and Three Huia by J. G. Keulemans	Riria Hotere & Dr Sandy Bartle, Former Curator & Alan Tennyson, Curator
97	Caravan of Love	New Zealand	1930s	A DIY love shack.	Caravan	Simon Morton & Kirstie Ross, Curator
98	Sea floor discoveries	New Zealand	2009	Cameras are sent a kilometre underwater to see what's lurking down there.	Not found in Collections Online	Riria Hotere & Vincent Zintzen, Researcher
99	Pigeon Posties	New Zealand	1899–1903	The original airmail posties.	Pigeon Post stamps, covers, postcards and letters	Simon Morton & Dr Patrick Brownsey, Senior Curator
100	A Seaweed Pantry	Titi Islands	Current	The hunting and storing of muttonbirds – a Maori delicacy	Poha titi (muttonbird container) and Puffinus griseus The muttonbird or titi	Simon Morton & Dougal Austin, Curator
