= Waiwhetū =

Suburb of Lower Hutt, New Zealand

- Suburb
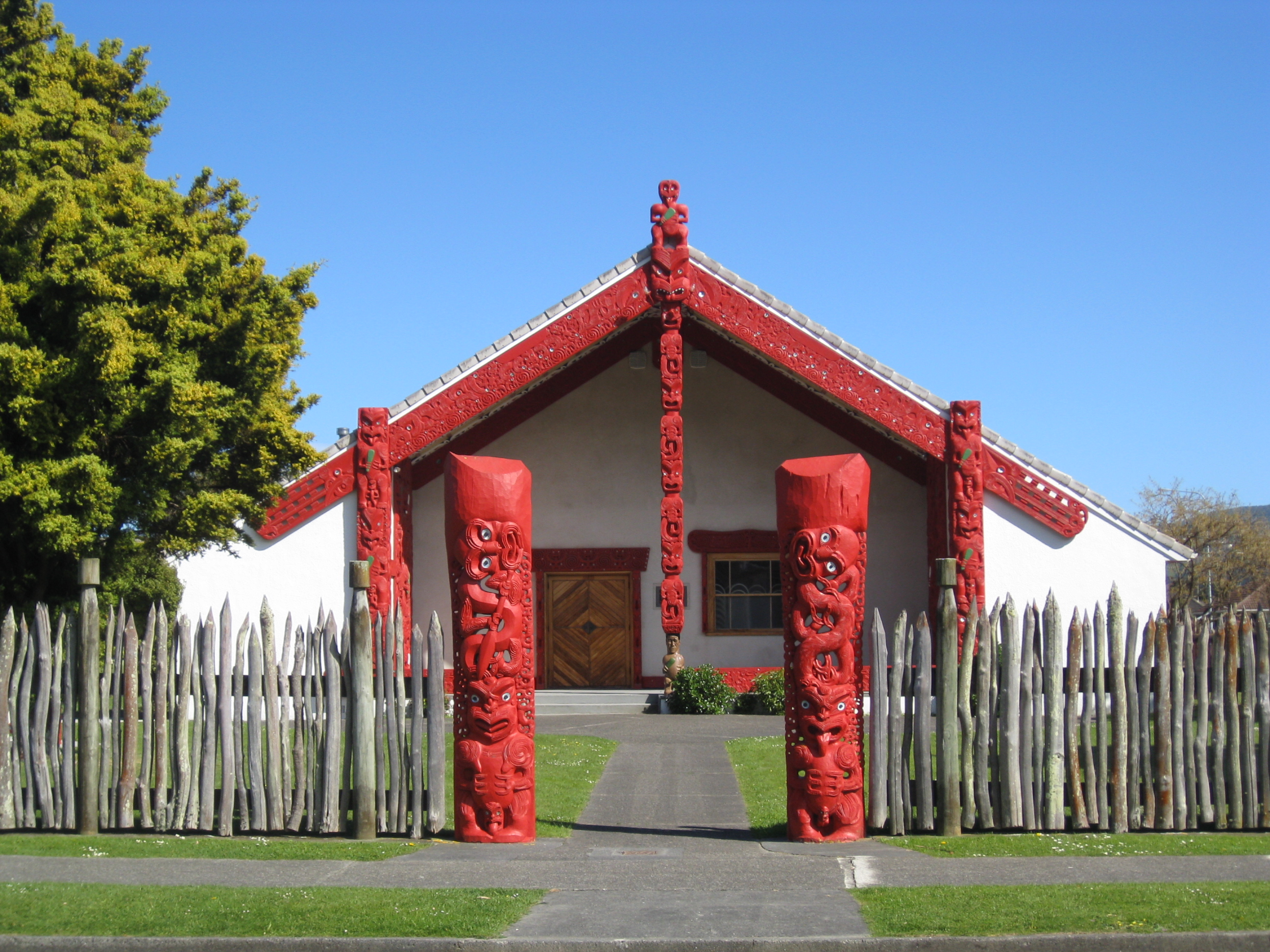
- Interactive map of Waiwhetū
- Coordinates: 41.224°S 174.915°E
- Country: New Zealand
- City: Lower Hutt
- Local authority: Hutt City Council
- Electoral ward: Central

Area
  - Land: 168 ha (420 acres)

Population (June 2025)
  - Total: 4,770
  - Density: 2,840/km^{2} (7,350/sq mi)

Woburn		Waterloo
	Waiwhetū
Moera	Gracefield

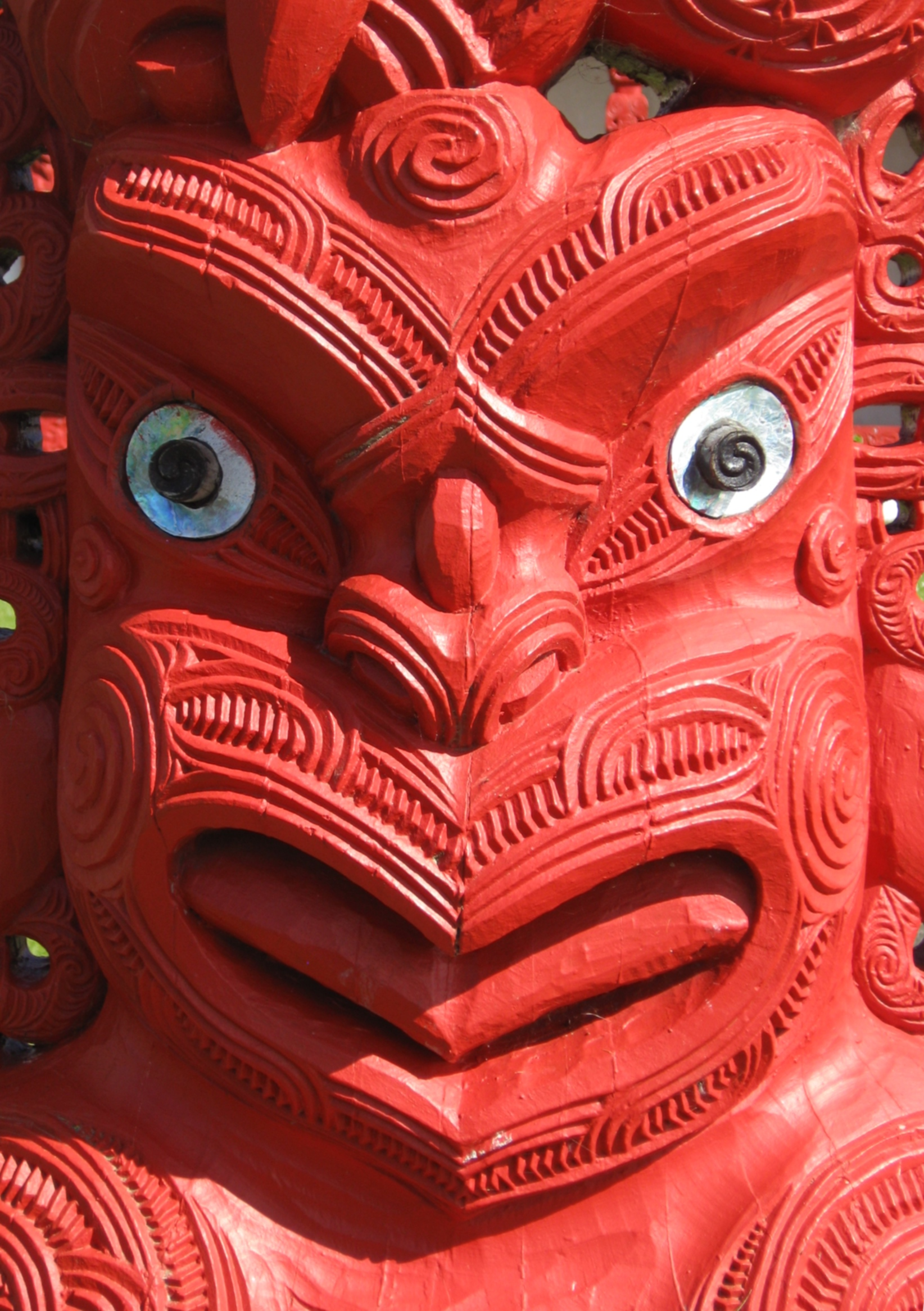
Carving detail of te waharoa at Waiwhetū Marae

Waiwhetū is an eastern suburb of Lower Hutt in the Wellington Region situated in the south of the North Island of New Zealand.

== History ==
In the 19th-century period of European settlement land at Waiwhetū was worked by Irish-born Alfred Ludlam, who was a member of three of New Zealand's four earliest parliaments. In the 1840s land was set aside by the New Zealand Company as a native reserve for the Te Āti Awa tribe.

From the 1890s to 1939, a flock mill operated on the bank of the Waiwhetū Stream. In the 1930s the New Zealand government compulsorily acquired land at Waiwhetū and built new homes for Te Āti Awa.

== Demographics ==
Waiwhetū, comprising the statistical areas of Waiwhetu North and Waiwhetu South, covers 1.68 km^{2} (0.65 sq mi). It had an estimated population of 4,770 as of June 2025, with a population density of 2,839 people per km^{2}.

Historical population
Year	Pop.	±% p.a.
2006	3,951	—
2013	3,963	+0.04%
2018	4,305	+1.67%
2023	4,470	+0.76%

Waiwhetū had a population of 4,470 in the 2023 New Zealand census, an increase of 165 people (3.8%) since the 2018 census, and an increase of 507 people (12.8%) since the 2013 census. There were 2,142 males, 2,310 females, and 18 people of other genders in 1,719 dwellings. 4.0% of people identified as LGBTIQ+. The median age was 36.5 years (compared with 38.1 years nationally). There were 876 people (19.6%) aged under 15 years, 879 (19.7%) aged 15 to 29, 2,115 (47.3%) aged 30 to 64, and 600 (13.4%) aged 65 or older.

People could identify as more than one ethnicity. The results were 58.4% European (Pākehā); 21.8% Māori; 11.7% Pasifika; 22.6% Asian; 2.6% Middle Eastern, Latin American and African New Zealanders (MELAA); and 1.4% other, which includes people giving their ethnicity as "New Zealander". English was spoken by 93.8%, Māori by 7.2%, Samoan by 3.3%, and other languages by 20.9%. No language could be spoken by 2.6% (e.g. too young to talk). New Zealand Sign Language was known by 0.6%. The percentage of people born overseas was 30.3, compared with 28.8% nationally.

Religious affiliations were 32.6% Christian, 5.8% Hindu, 2.1% Islam, 1.6% Māori religious beliefs, 1.9% Buddhist, 0.4% New Age, 0.1% Jewish, and 1.5% other religions. People who answered that they had no religion were 48.5%, and 5.8% of people did not answer the census question.

Of those at least 15 years old, 1,116 (31.1%) people had a bachelor's or higher degree, 1,611 (44.8%) had a post-high school certificate or diploma, and 873 (24.3%) people exclusively held high school qualifications. The median income was $47,900, compared with $41,500 nationally. 540 people (15.0%) earned over $100,000 compared to 12.1% nationally. The employment status of those at least 15 was 2,067 (57.5%) full-time, 414 (11.5%) part-time, and 102 (2.8%) unemployed.

Individual statistical areas
Name	Area (km^{2})	Population	Density (per km^{2})	Dwellings	Median age	Median income
Waiwhetu North	0.64	1,599	2,498	594	36.3 years	$45,000
Waiwhetu South	1.04	2,871	2,761	1,125	36.6 years	$49,500
New Zealand					38.1 years	$41,500

== Marae ==
The suburb includes Waiwhetū Marae, a marae (tribal meeting ground) of Taranaki Whānui ki te Upoko o te Ika and of Te Āti Awa. The marae, founded in 1960, includes the Arohanui ki te Tangata wharenui (meeting house). The marae is associated with Īhāia Puketapu, whose vision drove the project to build it.

Waiwhetū Marae features a number of significant carvings and has associations with a number of notable Māori artists. Some of the carvings had been created for the New Zealand Centennial Exhibition in 1940, and others were made specifically for the marae. The head carver was Hōne Te Kauru Taiapa, and other artists include Rangi Hetet, his wife Erenora Puketapu-Hetet (daughter of Īhaīa Puketapu) and their daughter Veranoa Hetet.

== Education ==
Our Lady of the Rosary School is a co-educational state-integrated Catholic primary school for Year 1 to 8 students, with a roll of 275 as of October 2025. It opened in 1932 and moved to the current site in 1941.

Waiwhetū is within the enrolment zones for Hutt Valley High School and Hutt Intermediate School.

== Waiwhetū Stream ==
The Waiwhetū Stream is a small watercourse that flows through the suburb and drains the eastern side of the Hutt Valley. It enters Wellington Harbour at the Hutt River estuary. Development and urbanisation of the Hutt Valley since the arrival of settlers led to increasing pollution and degradation of the stream environment. The stream was diverted into concrete culverts in many sections in an attempt to reduce flooding. Industrial development in the area around the lower reaches of the stream led to that section becoming an industrial sewer. In 2010, the stream was described as one of the most polluted waterways in New Zealand.

Pressure from the community beginning around 2003 helped to trigger a major project to clean up the lower reaches. This project was declared complete in June 2010, after the removal of 56,000 tonnes of toxic waste. In 2010-11, a community group was formed to lead restoration of the upper reaches of the stream. Over a period of 10 years, volunteers cleared invasive aquatic weeds and rubbish from 6 kilometres (3.7 mi) of the stream bed and established around 34,000 locally sourced native plants on the banks of the stream.
