= Hutt Art Society =

- Established: 1958
- Founder: Elisabeth Harper
- Type: Nonprofit
- Legal status: Incorporated Society; Registered Charity
- Headquarters: 9 - 11 Myrtle Street
- Location: Lower Hutt
- Coordinates: 41.2138°S 174.9041°E
- Website: www.huttart.co.nz

The Hutt Art Society is an incorporated society based in Lower Hutt, New Zealand that supports participation in the arts. The society was established in 1958, and is based in Myrtle Street, Lower Hutt. The society holds classes throughout the week.

The society is a registered charity. The constitution of the society, as re-registered in 2026, states that its specific purpose is "advancing education by providing facilities for participation in the arts for the public benefit".

The Hutt Art Society building in Myrtle Street is known as the Hutt Art Centre, and includes two exhibition galleries: the Odlin Gallery and the Huia Gallery, and separate studios for painting, pottery, printmaking and weaving.

== History ==
=== The first ten years 1958 to 1968 ===
In June 1958 a group of local artists held an exhibition in the art gallery of the Lower Hutt War Memorial Library, but there was severe criticism from the art critic at the Evening Post. The publicity arising from this criticism raised awareness of the number of people in the Lower Hutt area who were interested in exhibiting art. A general meeting to discuss the formation of an art group was held in the Memorial Library on 21 August 1958. At a second meeting in September, the name "Hutt Valley Art Club" was adopted. The founding president was Elisabeth Harper. The new club held its first exhibition in the Memorial Library in February 1960, and the exhibition was opened by the Mayor, Percy Dowse. The exhibition was visited by the Prime Minister Walter Nash, and received a favourable review from the same Evening Post art critic. The club was renamed as the Hutt Art Society at its second annual general meeting in 1960.

The club initially met in the art room of Hutt Valley High School, but eventually found accommodation in a disused manual training room owned by the Wellington Education Board in Woburn Road. In January 1961, the organisation was registered as an incorporated society, under the name Hutt Art Society. By February 1961, the society had 114 senior members, and 10 junior members, and had established its own rooms. Later that year, the society funded the purchase of the Spencer Gore painting The Artist's Wife, for donation to the National Art Gallery.

In June 1962, the society was gifted three paintings by the New Zealand artist Mina Arndt, donated by the artist's son and stepdaughter for the society's permanent collection. During 1963, the society's collection was expanded with gifts of oils by Russell Clark, Sydney Thompson, William Wauchop, and Marcus King, and watercolours by Nugent Welch, Margaret Stoddart, and Charles Howorth.

In December 1963, the society opened an exhibition from their permanent collection in the Lower Hutt War Memorial Library gallery. The Hutt News in reporting on the society's exhibitions in 1964 at the Memorial Library gallery commented that the space was far too small, and that there was need for new art gallery space elsewhere.

In 1964, further acquisitions for the society's permanent collection included watercolours by Mervyn Taylor and Peter McIntyre. By July 1965, the president of the society reported that they had 282 members. The scope of its exhibitions was expanded in October 1965 with a display of hand-painted pottery and sculpture. This exhibition was described by the Evening Post as a notable new achievement in fostering art in the Hutt Valley.

In February 1966, the society handed over 32 works from its permanent collection to Hutt City Council, as part of the Hutt City 75th jubilee celebrations. In 1966, the society was still using the Wellington Education Board premises in Woburn Road, but had identified the need to find permanent headquarters. By 1967, there were 50 members of the society active in weaving, and in October the society mounted an exhibitions of handcraft including weaving, china-painting, pottery and sculpture. The society celebrated its ten year anniversary in 1968, and reported that they had 587 members, including around 80 junior and intermediate members, making it one of the largest art societies in New Zealand.

=== New premises ===
The society was a strong advocate for the establishment of a new public art gallery in Lower Hutt, and made financial contributions towards the project. The Dowse Art Museum opened in 1971.

In 1971, the society was obliged to move out of the manual training building in Woburn Road, because it had been declared an earthquake risk. The society relocated to a large house at 9 Myrtle Street, leased from Hutt City Council. Around 7 years later, the society also leased the adjacent house at 11 Myrtle Street. The council re-zoned the site for recreation and incorporated it into the Hutt Recreation Ground. This provided an opportunity for the society to develop its own gallery where the work of amateur artists could be exhibited. The Odlin Gallery was built in a link building between the two houses on the corner of Myrtle and Huia streets. A ramp to improve accessibility to the new gallery was constructed in July 1979. The Odlin Gallery was officially opened on 9 September 1979, with an inaugural exhibition of member's works. The Odlin was the first art gallery to become available for public hire in Lower Hutt.
