= Boswijk =

Boswijk is a Dutch surname. Notable people with the surname include:

- Christine Boswijk (born 1939), New Zealand ceramicist
- Derk Boswijk (born 1989), Dutch politician
