= Gordon Crook =

New Zealand artist (1921–2011)

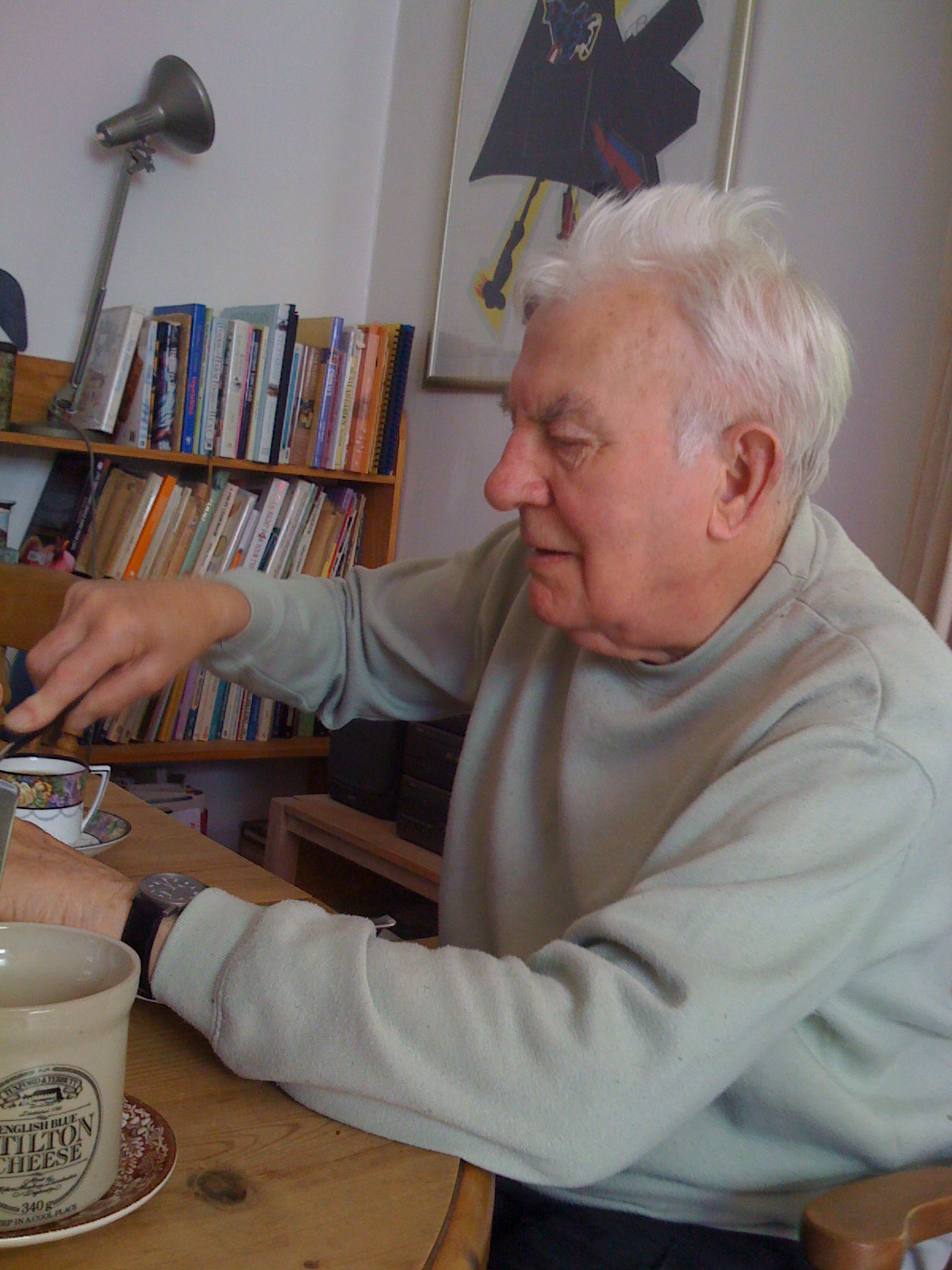
- Gordon Crook in his Wellington home and studio, 2008
- Born: Gordon Stephen Crook; 11 October 1921; Richmond, Surrey, England
- Died: 26 August 2011 (aged 89); Wellington, New Zealand
- Education: St Martin's School; Central School of Art
- Known for: ceramics, textiles, printmaking, painting, drawing
- Patrons: Jim Barr, James Mack

Gordon Stephen Crook (11 October 1921 – 26 August 2011) was a visual artist working across the fields of ceramics, textiles, printmaking, painting and drawing.

== Early life ==
Born in Richmond, Surrey, England, Crook's parents separated when he was four and he moved with his mother from London to Sussex. He grew up in Sussex, moving between foster homes, and then attended boarding school in Chichester. He joined the merchant navy at 17, and served in the Royal Air Force during World War II.

== Training ==
In 1945 Crook received a grant to study at St Martin's School, London. In 1948 he enrolled at the Central School of Art, known at the time for its innovative work in textiles. Crook graduated with a degree in textile design and began tutoring at the Central School, before being employed as a lecturer.

== Career ==
After completing his training Crook lived in London for 22 years, working as a freelance designer and teaching at the Central School and the Royal College of Art. He also exhibited his own work, ceramics, drawings, paintings, and tapestries. The artist once said:

Because I work in a lot of media, people can't get to grips with my work. The point is that oneself as an artist remains consistent. My object is to end up with something that I haven't seen before, to get an image which I could not have imagined

In 1972, aged 51, Crook decided to emigrate to New Zealand and settled in Wellington, where he spent the rest of his life. He continued making art until his death in 2011, aged 89, and was known for his diverse and prodigious output.

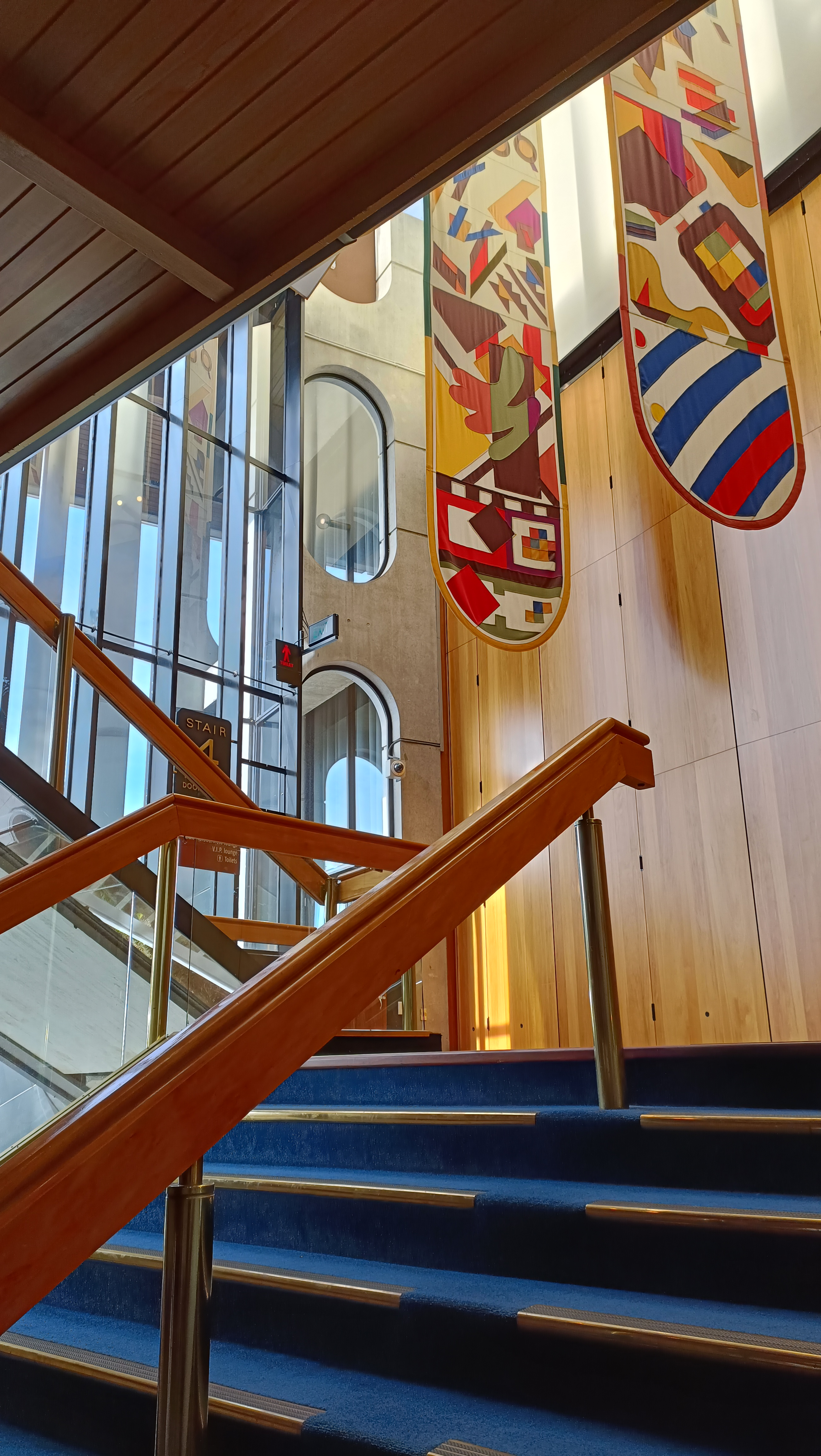
Michael Fowler Centre interior

In 1979 Crook was commissioned to produce a set of 20 banners for the Miles Warren-designed New Zealand Embassy in Washington. Hanging in the Great Hall of the embassy building the banners measure five metres by 1 metre and feature South Pacific imagery and heraldry. The banners were made by Nancye Smeaton, manager of the then-New Zealand Ballet and Opera Trust production unit. Between 1981 and 1983 Crook worked on a series of larger banners for the entrance foyer of the Michael Fowler Centre in Wellington.

Crook designed and wove some of his own tapestries; others he collaborated on with other professional weavers. His suite of small tapestries 18 Maritimes for example, in the collection of The Dowse Art Museum were designed by Crook, inspired by 18 small collages made using colour photocopying techniques, and then woven over 1995–1996 by Sue Batten at the Victorian Tapestry Workshop. Crook also collaborated extensively with weaver Lesley Nicholls, producing more than 20 tapestries together.

While he worked across many formats – including pastel drawings, painting, collages, paper-making and screenprinting – Crook was best-known and most recognized for his textile work. Writing in 1980 critic Neil Rowe observed:

When assessing a talent as multi-faceted as Crook's it is difficult to single out one aspect for consideration above the others. In my opinion, his work with textiles and fabrics constitutes his most significant contribution to contemporary art. ... In New Zealand there is no designer in this field who is as highly qualified or as accomplished as Gordon Crook. In terms of colour and design, his tapestries are by far the most consistently exciting work in the medium made here.

Crook received significant support from Jim Barr and James Mack, two early directors of The Dowse Art Museum in Lower Hutt, who collected and exhibited his work.

Significant solo exhibitions of Crook's work include:

- 1993–1996 An Introduction to the world of Gordon Crook, touring throughout New Zealand
- 2000 The Wolfman by Gordon Crook, Marsden Art Gallery
- 2011 Gordon Crook: 18 Maritimes, The Dowse Art Museum

Crook's two suites of pastels, were shown at two exhibitions in Wellington:

- 26 March to 13 April 1985 In Memorium, which included 13 pastel drawings, at the Janne Land Gallery
- 7 to 30 March 1986 Gordon Crook: pastel works at the City Art Gallery

Publications:

- Catalogue of an exhibition of tapestries and drawings based on the theme of Adam and Eve, Wellington: Galerie Legend, 1978
- Gordon Crook, Wellington: Brooker Gallery, 1993. ISBN 0473021862
- Biography of the mind Wellington: Page Blackie Gallery, 2013.

== Gordon Crook: A Life of Art ==
In 2010 a documentary about Crook, Gordon Crook: A Life of Art, by director Clare O'Leary premiered at New Zealand's International Film Festival. The documentary traced Crook's life from his early years in foster care to his time as a London Central School of Art lecturer to his decades in Wellington and featured interviews with Crook, his friends, supporters, students and dealer representatives. The documentary also features autobiographical narrative, including poems written by Crook.

Further information:

- Trailer for 'Gordon Crook: A Life of Art'

== Death ==
Crook died in Wellington on 26 August 2011.

== Collections ==
Crook's work is held in collections across New Zealand.

- Works in the collection of the Auckland Art Gallery
- Works in the collection of Christchurch Art Gallery
- Works in the collection of The Dowse Art Museum
- Works in the collection of the Museum of New Zealand Te Papa Tongarewa
