= Verdcourt =

Verdcourt is a surname. Notable people with the surname include:

- Ann Verdcourt (born 1934), New Zealand artist
- Bernard Verdcourt (1925–2011), English botanist and taxonomist
