= Steve Fullmer =

American-born New Zealand potter (born 1946)

- Born: 1946; Portland, Oregon
- Education: Mt. San Antonio Jr College (Commercial Arts), California 1964- 1965. Long Beach Jr College (Commercial Arts and Pottery) 1971-1973.
- Known for: Pottery, ceramics
- Awards: Fletcher Brownbuilt Pottery Awards 1985, Merit Award. Fletcher Brownbuilt Pottery Awards 1986, Supreme Award. Fletcher Brownbuilt Pottery Awards 1987, joint winner, Supreme Award
- Website: http://stevefullmer.com/

Steve Fullmer (born 1946) is an American-born New Zealand potter.

== Early life and education ==
He was born in Portland, Oregon in 1946 and completed a Commercial Arts course at Mt. San Antonio Jr College in California between 1964 and 1965. Between 1971 and 1973, he studied Commercial Arts and Pottery at Long Beach Jr College.

== Career and process ==
He first visited New Zealand in 1973 and emigrated in 1975, establishing a studio in Nelson. For ten years he worked with a woodfired kiln, before experimenting with gas, diesel and electric kilns. He works largely with earthenware pottery.

In an interview with Form Gallery in Christchurch, Fullmer discussed his working processes, saying,

"Some years ago I started exploring with new forms at the lower firing temperatures. Now what I try to show more than anything else is the feeling of clay. By stretching, tearing, pulling and pushing, the plastic qualities of the material become apparent. The firing procedure is very important as it gives life to this fragile material. I try to use fire in such a way that the passage of the flames show on the body of the work. Although I have a tremendous respect for traditions of ceramics, I do not wish to be a slave to them. I want my work to represent my time, my thoughts, and my people."

== Recognition ==
In 1985, Fullmer won a Merit Award at the Fletcher Brownbuilt Pottery Awards, going on to win the Supreme Award the following year. In 1987, he was the joint winner of the Supreme Award at the Fletcher Brownbuilt Pottery Awards. In 1992, his work was included in Treasures of the Underworld at the Seville World Expo.

His work is held in the collections of Museum of New Zealand Te Papa Tongarewa.
