= Hariata Ropata-Tangahoe =

New Zealand painter

- Born: 1952 (age 73–74); Ōtaki, New Zealand
- Known for: visual arts

Hariata Ropata-Tangahoe (born 1952) is a New Zealand artist, painter and author. She is of Ngāti Toa, Ngāti Raukawa and Te Atiawa descent. Her works are held in the permanent collections of the Museum of New Zealand Te Papa Tongarewa, the BNZ Art Collection, the Dowse Art Gallery and the University of Auckland Art Collection.
