= Rangi Hetet =

New Zealand artist

Rangi Hetet ONZM
- Born: 18 April 1937
- Died: 18 November 2024 (aged 87); Lower Hutt
- Education: New Zealand Māori Arts and Crafts Institute
- Known for: Whakairo
- Spouse: Erenora Puketapu-Hetet
- Children: 4, including Veranoa Hetet

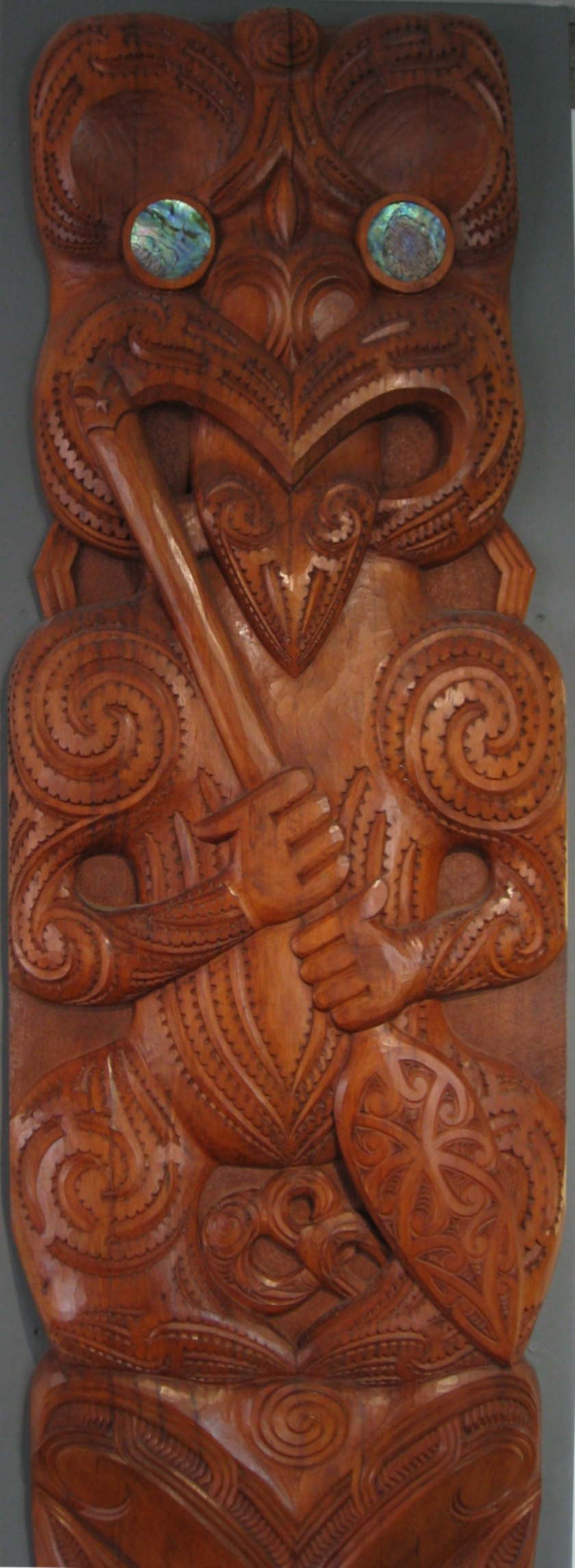
Detail of a poupou by Hetet hanging in the Dowse Art Museum, one of a pair of poupou commissioned by the museum on their fifth anniversary in 1975. The poupou are carved wooden figures with inset pāua shell eyes. This figure represents Te Puni.

Te Rangikaiamokura Wirihana Hetet ONZM (18 April 1937 – 18 November 2024) was a Māori master carver (tohunga whakairo) of Ngāti Tūwharetoa and Ngāti Maniapoto descent.

== Early life and family ==
Hetet was born in 1937 to Charles Wilson Hetet and Lillian Hetet (née Smallman). He married Erenora Puketapu at Waiwhetū Marae in 1960, and the couple had four children, including the weaver Veranoa Hetet.

== Carving ==
Hetet was one of the carvers of the meeting house at Waiwhetū in the 1950s, during which time he met Erenora Puketapu-Hetet, who became his wife. His grandmother, Rangimārie Hetet was a weaver from Te Kūiti, who passed her skills on to Erenora Puketapu-Hetet.

Hetet trained in the fraternity of carvers known as Konae Aronui under tohunga whakairo Tuhaka Kapua and later Hōne Taiapa at the New Zealand Māori Arts and Crafts Institute. He had only two apprentices, including Sam Hauwaho.

As his wife did, Hetet saw his art as having a spiritual dimension:

The carver Rangi Hetet says that the materials he uses are not simply materials—they have a spiritual nature, being descended from Tāne. A carver should show respect for Tane by not carving in too flamboyantly a manner; he should, of course, inject his own mauri into the work, but should do so for the sake of the work, not his own sake. Hetet tries to use raw timber rather than milled timber so as to be able to show respect by following the nature of character of the timber.

Hetet's commissions included a number of meeting houses, four waka taua (war canoes 60+ feet long) and a number of institutional pieces such as the one at LINZ. One of the 1989 sesquicentenary waka, Te Raukura, was subsequently involved in a legal dispute between the iwi who saw themselves as Kaitiaki of the waka (having housed,paddled and looked after the waka within the Waiwhetu settlement where it was carved) and the Wellington city council who wanted to take ownership of the waka that it has partly funded.

In 1986, Hetet travelled to the Field Museum in Chicago to demonstrate his craft in support of the international exhibition Te Maori, which toured the United States and New Zealand from 1984 to 1987. He also exhibited in venues such as the Māori Art Market.

In the 2004 New Year Honours, Hetet was appointed an Officer of the New Zealand Order of Merit, for services as a Māori master carver.

Hetet died in Lower Hutt on 18 November 2024.
