= Veranoa Hetet =

New Zealand Māori weaver

Veranoa Hetet QSM
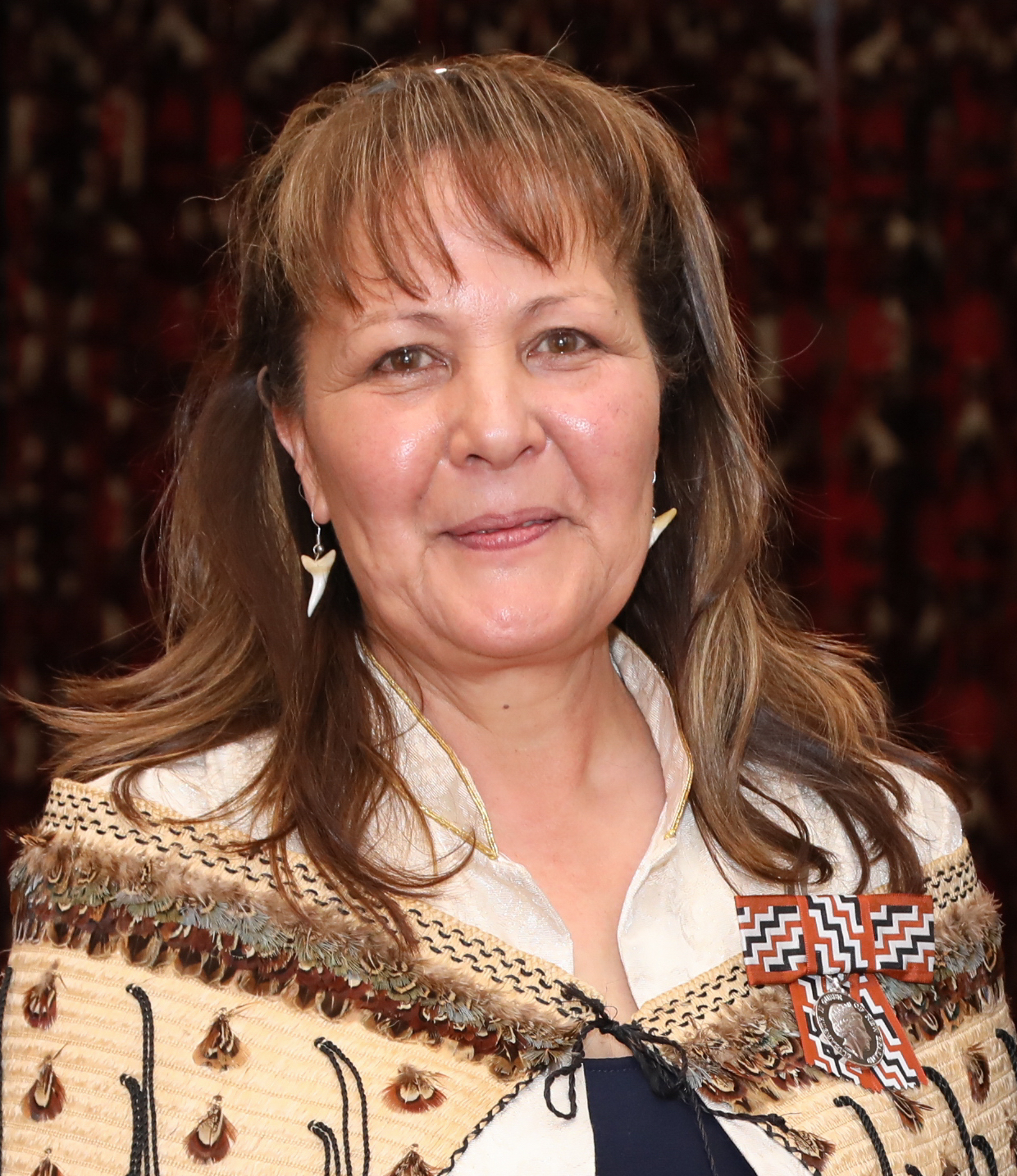
- Hetet in 2020
- Born: Veranoa Angelique Puketapu-Hetet; 1966 (age 59–60); Lower Hutt, New Zealand
- Known for: Weaving
- Website: Hetet School of Māori Art

Veranoa Angelique Hetet QSM (born 1966) is a New Zealand Māori weaver and contemporary artist.

== Biography ==
Hetet was born in 1966 in Waiwhetū, Lower Hutt. She was taught how to weave her first kete when she was 13 years old by her mother Erenora Puketapu-Hetet. Her mother went on to teach her weaving techniques in raranga, tāniko and whatu kakahu, and from her father she learnt tukutuku and kowhaiwhai from her father, master carver Rangi Hetet. Several generations of the Hetet family have been practitioners and teachers of Māori weaving techniques, ever since Rangimārie Hetet composed a waiata asking her descendants to uphold these traditions.

Since 1996 Hetet has taught weaving at tertiary institutions such as Te Wananga o Raukawa, Wellington Polytechnic, Te Whanau Paneke, and The Open Polytechnic of New Zealand. She is based in Waiwhetū, Lower Hutt, where she teaches weaving online at the Hetet School of Māori Art started by her parents.

In 2012 Hetet and her group of weavers Te Roopu Mīro were weavers in residence for the exhibition Kahu Ora at the Museum of New Zealand Te Papa Tongarewa. In a previous discussion with Awhina Tamarapa, the curator of Kuhu Ora, Hetet describes her passion for learning, 'Every time you learn a technique, it opens up the possibilities even more. So the more you’re exposed to, the more possibilities there are for creating things'.

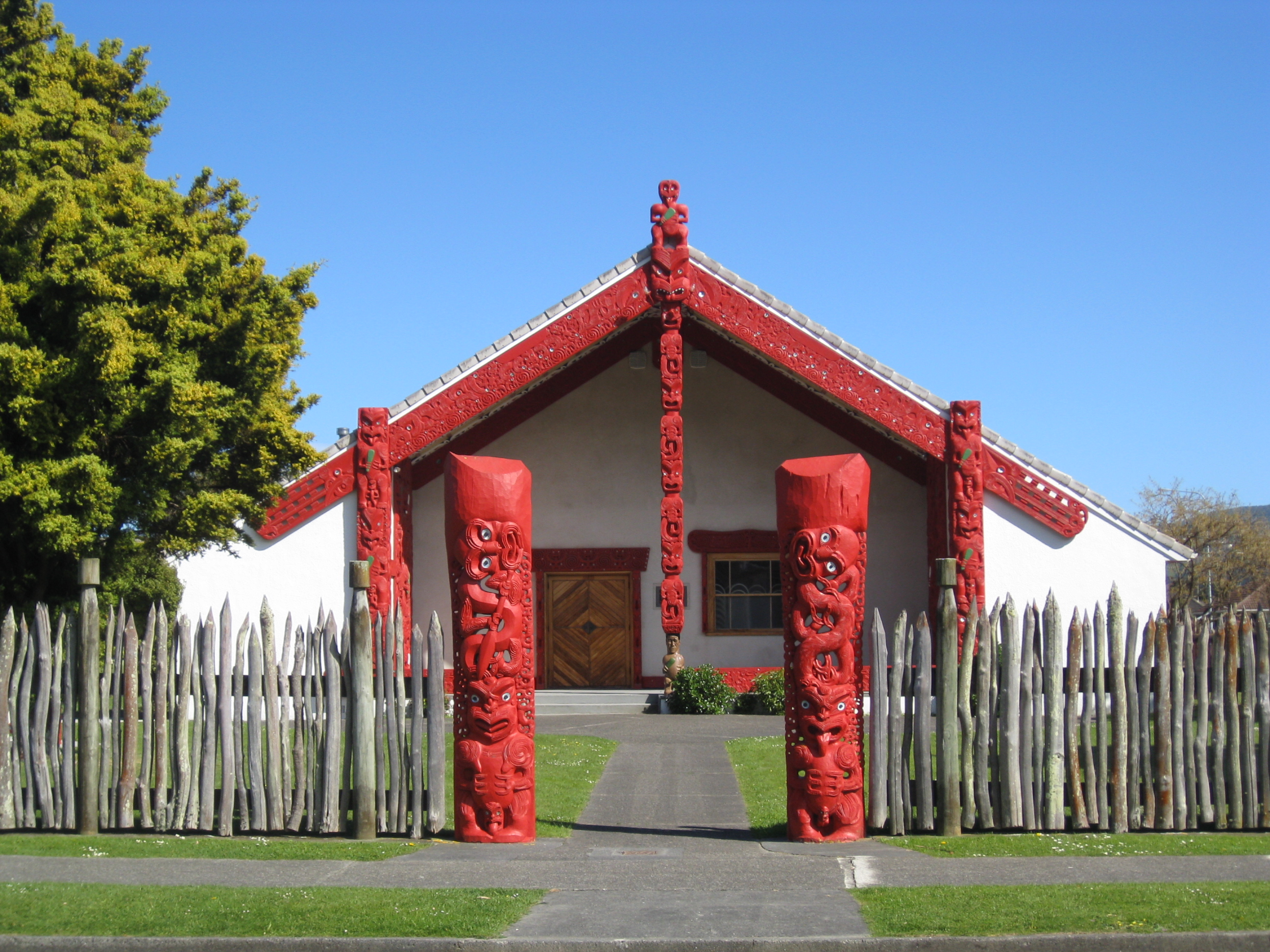
Waiwhetū Marae in Lower Hutt, Wellington

Hetet has received funding from Creative New Zealand for the development of new works and travel. In 2014 she received a substantial arts grant to produce works for an exhibition at The Dowse Art Museum. She has exhibited and travelled widely, including a 2014 one-month residency on St Helena, researching and teaching about extracting muka from the flax which has grown on the island since the mid-1900s.

The Waiwhetū Marae has a close association with the Hetet family and the meeting house Aroha ki te Tangata includes art work by Veranoa Hetet as well as her mother and father.

== Honours and awards ==
In the 2020 New Year Honours, Hetet was awarded the Queen's Service Medal, for services to Māori art.

== Exhibitions ==
Her work has been exhibited at The Museum of New Zealand Te Papa Tongarewa, The Dowse Art Museum, City Gallery Wellington, Waikato Museum and Puke Ariki.

- Kahu Ora (2012), Museum of New Zealand Te Papa Tongarewa.
- Veranoa Hetet: Creating Potential (10 Oct 2020 – 28 Feb 2021), The Dowse Art Museum

== Family ==
Hetet’s mother was master weaver Erenora Puketapu-Hetet, and her father is master carver Rangi Hetet. Hetet is of Te Atiawa, Ngāti Tuwharetoa and Ngāti Maniapoto descent. She attributes her knowledge of Māori arts to her upbringing and family. Her great-grandmother was Dame Rangimārie Hetet and her great-aunt was Diggeress Te Kanawa.

Hetet is married to carver Sam Hauwaho. They have five children.
