= Christine Boswijk =

New Zealand ceramicist (born 1939)

Christine Boswijk ONZM
- Born: Christine Lynn McDowell; 1939 (age 86–87); Christchurch, New Zealand
- Education: Otago Polytechnic, Dunedin; National Art School, Sydney
- Known for: Ceramics
- Website: Christine Boswijk Workshop

Christine Lynn Boswijk ONZM (née McDowell; born 1939) is a New Zealand ceramicist. Her works are held in institutions both in New Zealand and internationally including in the Museum of New Zealand Te Papa Tongarewa, the Dowse Art Museum, the Christchurch Art Gallery, the Suter Art Gallery, the Museum of Taipei and the Aberystwyth University ceramics collection.

== Early life and family ==
Boswijk was born in Christchurch in 1939, the daughter of Edna Frances (née King) and the Reverend Matthew Alexander McDowell. She married the Dutch-born pioneering Nelson cafe owner Eelco Boswijk in Nelson in 1962. Boswijk originally worked as a dental nurse before decided at the age of 37 to train as a ceramicist. Boswijk's grandson Dok was a motorcycle salesman in Wellington, and died in a motorcycle crash on 7 November 2022.

== Career ==
She graduated from Otago Polytechnic School of Fine Art with a diploma in ceramics in 1977. While there she was taught by potters Michael Trumic and Neil Grant. After completing her diploma she returned to Nelson and became a full time potter producing ware intended for domestic use. In 1988, Boswijk gained a postgraduate diploma with honours from the National Art School, East Sydney Technical College. She received funding for this study through a Queen Elizabeth II Arts Council grant. Her time at the National Art School changed her approach to her art, including ensuring the firing process played a more pivotal role in the creation of her pieces. It was after obtaining her postgraduate diploma that Boswijk moved to her studio in Upper Moutere.

During her four decade long career Boswijk forged a reputation for being one of New Zealand's most acclaimed ceramic artists. Her work is held in the collections of many New Zealand, as well as international institutions, such as the Museum of New Zealand Te Papa Tongarewa, the Dowse Art Museum, the Christchurch Art Gallery, the Suter Art Gallery, the Museum of Taipei, and the Aberystwyth University ceramics collection. She gained inspiration for many of her pieces from New Zealand's geology and terrain.

Major exhibitions she has participated in include Treasures of the Underworld at the 1992, Seville World Expo, Kisses, Crosses and Flowers in 2007, at Milford Galleries, Queenstown and Before Words, in 2010 at Woollaston Estate, Nelson.

In the 2004 Queen's Birthday Honours, she was appointed an Officer of the New Zealand Order of Merit, for services to ceramic arts.

In 2020, the Suter Art Gallery held a retrospective exhibition on Boswijk's career that included many of her works created during her 40-year career.

== Exhibitions ==
- 2020, Thinking Through My Hands The Suter Art Gallery, Nelson.
- 2010 Before Words Woollaston Estate, Nelson.
- 2007, Kisses, Crosses and Flowers Milford Galleries, Queenstown.
- 2004, Fact Fusion Faith The Suter Art Gallery, Nelson.
- 1992, Treasures of the Underworld Seville World Expo, Seville, Spain.
