= Erenora Puketapu-Hetet =

New Zealand artist, weaver and author

Erenora Puketapu-Hetet ONZM JP
- Born: Erenora Puketapu; 28 January 1941; Lower Hutt, New Zealand
- Died: 23 July 2006 (aged 65); Lower Hutt, New Zealand
- Known for: Weaver and author
- Spouse: Rangi Hetet
- Relatives: Īhāia Puketapu (father); Ihakara Puketapu (brother); Veranoa Hetet (daughter); Lillian Owen (daughter); Kataraina Hetet (daughter)

Erenora Puketapu-Hetet ONZM JP (née Puketapu, 28 January 1941 – 23 July 2006) was a noted New Zealand weaver and author. A key figure in the Māori cultural renaissance, she helped change perceptions of Māori weaving/raranga from craft to internationally recognised art.

== Biography ==
Of Te Atiawa descent, Puketapu-Hetet was born in Lower Hutt on 28 January 1941, where she died on 23 July 2006. Her parents were Vera May Puketapu (née Yeates), who was Pākehā, and Īhāia Pōrutu Puketapu.

Puketapu-Hetet grew up in the Te Atiawa tribal settlement at Waiwhetū Marae near Lower Hutt and married Rangi Hetet, one of the carvers who had worked on the marae. Rangi's grandmother, Rangimārie Hetet, herself a distinguished practitioner of raranga, taught Erenora the art of whatu kākahu korowai (cloaks).

Both Erenora and Rangi worked in the late 1970s at the New Zealand Māori Arts and Crafts Institute, which was established in Rotorua in 1963 to preserve traditional Māori cultural practices; between 1978 and 1981, as a weaving tutor there she wove the first kahu kiwi for the Institute.

In the early 80s the couple returned to the Hutt Valley, where they led the decoration of Wainuiomata Marae. Later the couple worked at Te Papa as Maori Protocol Officer/Advisor.

Puketapu-Hetet's daughters Veranoa Hetet and Kataraina Hetet are also weavers.

== Artistic and cultural achievements ==
Part of Puketapu-Hetet's work at Te Papa involved bridge-building between the Māori world and the European cultural institutions, leading to her featuring in a number of weaving-related works.

Among other places, a number of her art works are in Te Papa's collection, and the British Museum holds a pair of poi made by Puketapu-Hetet in 1995 and a kete muka (woven bag) made in 1994. The kete is made of flax fibre dyed black, woven in double-row twining, with two rows of pheasant feathers along the bottom; it is decorated with a taniko border in black, brown, yellow, and white, .

In common with other Māori artists, Puketapu-Hetet believed that art has a spiritual dimension and hidden meanings:

The ancient Polynesian belief is that the artist is a vehicle through whom the gods can create. Art is sacred and interrelated with the concepts of mauri, mana and tapu.

Maori weaving is full of symbolism and hidden meanings. embodied with the spiritual values and beliefs of the Maori people.

She wove using materials such as muka (prepared fibre of New Zealand flax), paua shell, stainless steel wire and feathers, including kiwi feathers.

In 1986, Puketapu-Hetet travelled to the Field Museum in Chicago to demonstrate her craft in support of the international exhibition Te Maori, which toured the United States and New Zealand from 1984 to 1987.

Tu Tangata: Weaving for the People (2000), a documentary by Robin Greenberg, premiered at the New Zealand Film Festival before airing on television. In it Puketapu-Hetet and her family discuss "learning the disciplines of weaving and the importance of passing this gift on" to her descendants and the artists "of tomorrow." More provocatively, given weaving's cultural significance within traditional Māori culture and the connection between traditional art practices and Māori sociocultural identity, while presenting some of her more recent work Puketapu-Hetet discusses the need to adopt new practices, e.g., the use of new materials in light of the scarcity of traditional plants, such as harakeke/flax.

A survey exhibition of the work of Erenora Puketapu-Hetet and Rangi Hetet, Legacy: The Art of Rangi Hetet and Erenora Puketapu-Hetet, was staged at The Dowse Art Museum in 2016. Robin Greenberg's Mo te Iwi: Carving for the People (2019) follows preparations for this exhibition; along with its focus on Rangi Hetet's work, this film again shows how the art form is learned and shared within family and community as a whole. As Lillian Hetet, Erenora and Rangi's daughter says in Mo te Iwi, "Carving does not exist alone, just as a skill. It exists within a whole body of knowledge and that body of knowledge exists and is held by a whole community of people, by a whole nationhood of people."

== Awards and recognitions ==
In 1990, Puketapu-Hetet was awarded the New Zealand 1990 Commemoration Medal. She was appointed an Officer of the New Zealand Order of Merit in the 2002 New Year Honours, for services to weaving. She was appointed to the board of the New Zealand Māori Arts and Crafts Institute in 2004. She was a member of the Queen Elizabeth Arts Council of New Zealand.

== Publications ==
- Erenora Puketapu-Hetet, Maori weaving, Auckland: Pitman, 1989 ISBN 0-908575-77-7
