= Leonard Mitchell (artist) =

New Zealand artist and gallery owner

Victor Leonard William Mitchell (8 March 1925 – 6 January 1980) was a notable New Zealand artist and gallery owner. He was born in Palmerston North, New Zealand on 8 March 1925.

The Lower Hutt War Memorial Library in Lower Hutt houses three large, important works by Mitchell that are an integral part of the library's design.
