= Dowse Art Museum =

Lower Hutt art museum

Coordinates: 41.2118°S 174.9043°E

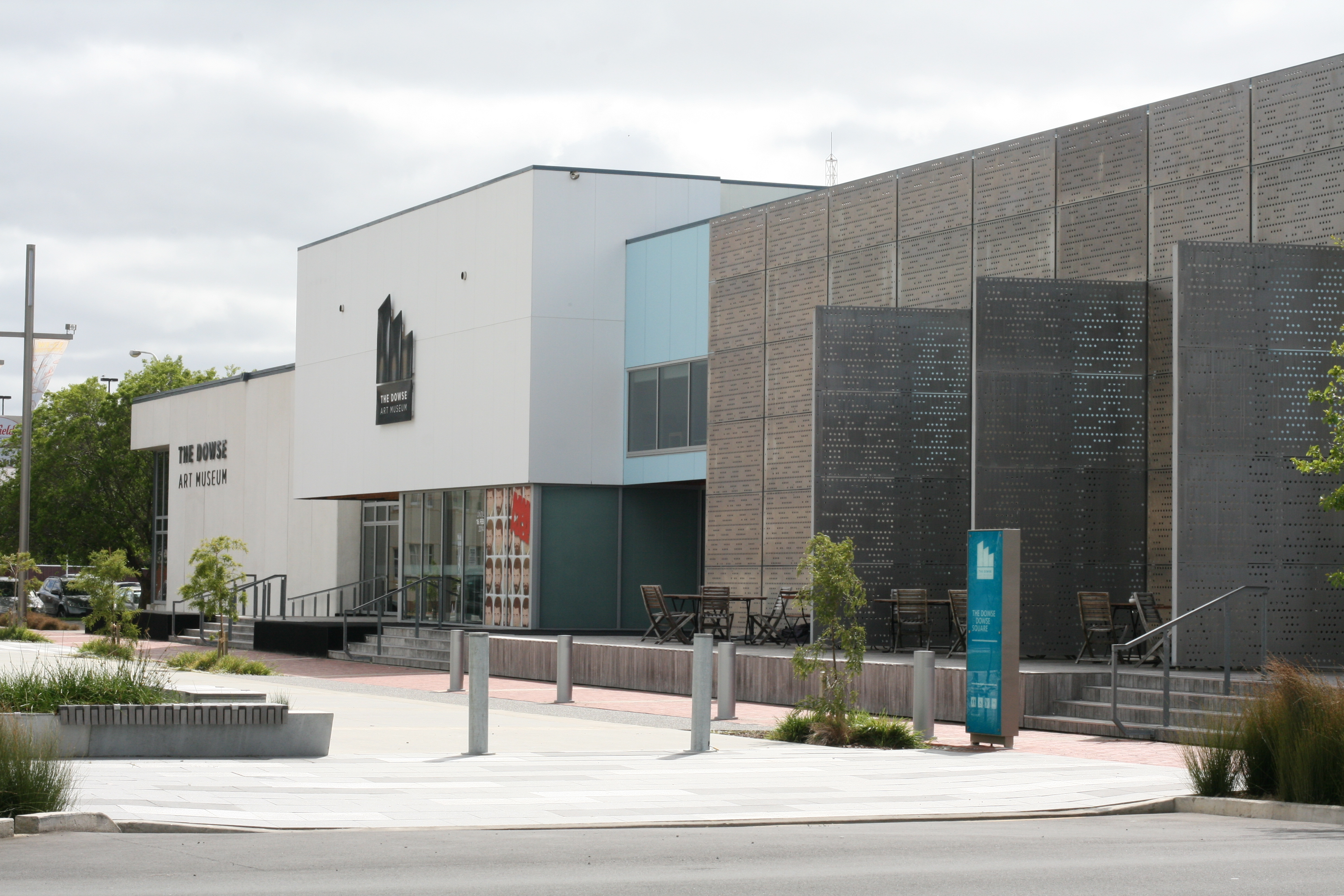
- Former name: Dowse Art Gallery
- Established: 1971
- Location: Lower Hutt, New Zealand
- Website: dowse.org.nz

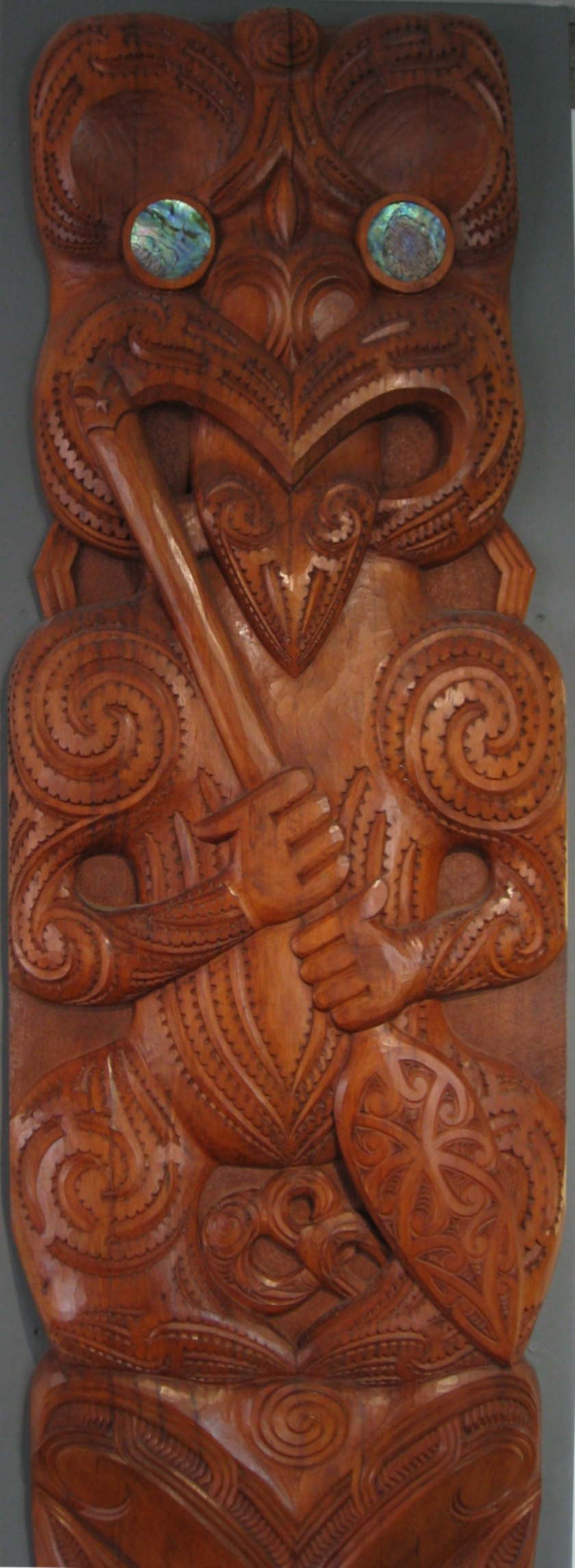
Detail of a poupou by Rangi Hetet hanging in the Dowse Art Museum. One of a pair of poupou commissioned by the museum on their fifth anniversary in 1975. The poupou are carved wooden figures with inset pāua shell eyes. This figure represents Te Puni.

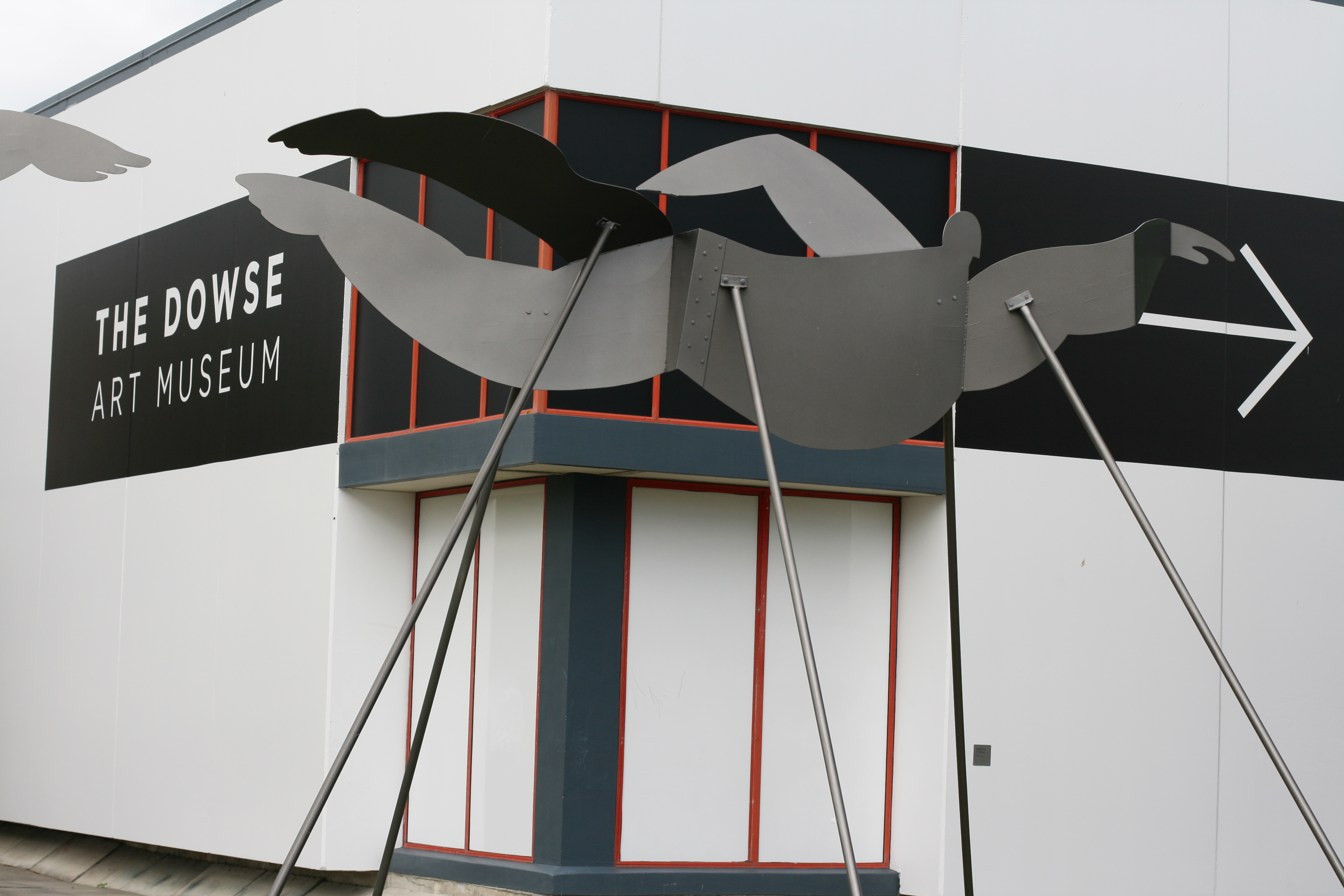
One of Paul Dibble's 'Swimmers in Space' in front of the Dowse Art Gallery

The Dowse Art Museum (formerly the Dowse Art Gallery) is a municipal art gallery in Lower Hutt, New Zealand.

Opened in 1971 in the Lower Hutt CBD, the Dowse occupies a stand-alone building adjacent to other municipal facilities. The building was completely remodelled in 2013. The Dowse's holdings generally focus on New Zealand artists of both national and local significance.

== History ==
The Dowse Art Museum is named after Mayor Percy and Mayoress Mary Dowse, both of whom died prior to the museum opening. Percy Dowse served as the mayor of Hutt City from 1950 to 1970. He was a firm believer in the principle of having physical, social, and cultural facilities in modern cities and he initiated a building phase in the city that saw the construction of landmark buildings such as the Lower Hutt War Memorial Library, the Lower Hutt Town Hall, and the Ewen Bridge. He championed the addition of an art gallery to the building spree. His wife, Mary Dowse, was the first president of the Hutt Valley National Council of Women. She was also an ardent supporter of the arts. She teamed up with Elizabeth Harper from the Hutt Art Society, and the duo lobbied the City Council. They succeeded in their endeavour when, in 1963, the Council agreed to provide space for an art gallery. The gallery was originally housed in an extension of the War Memorial Library but after Mary died in a road accident in 1964 the City Council made a unanimous decision to honour her by constructing a new building for the art gallery. The museum was only partially completed when Percy died in 1970.

=== Directors ===
- David Millar was the founding director, heading the museum 1971–1976. He set the direction of the institution, including buying ceramics and decorative arts.
- Jim Barr was director 1976–1981. During his tenure the Dowse's controversial work, Colin McCahon’s Wall of Death was acquired.
- James Mack was director 1981–1988, and in 1982 changed the name of the institution from the Dowse Art Gallery to the Dowse Art Museum.
- Bob Maysmor was director 1988–1998.
- Tim Walker was director 1998–2008.
- Cam McCracken was director 2008–2012, having had roles at Te Tuhi Centre for the Arts and the Auckland Art Gallery in Auckland and the Waikato Museum of Art and History. He left to become director of the Dunedin Public Art Gallery.
- Courtney Johnston was director 2012–2018, after roles at the National Library of New Zealand and Boost New Media where she worked in communications and web roles. In 2019 she was appointed chief executive of the Museum of New Zealand Te Papa Tongarewa.
- Karl Chitham started as director January 2019, having been the director of Tauranga Art Gallery.

== Holdings ==
Holdings include national figures such as Ralph Hotere, Colin McCahon, Don Peebles and Gordon Walters as well as locally connected, nationally significant, artists as Rangi Hetet, Rangimārie Hetet, Gordon Crook and Hariata Ropata-Tangahoe. There have been strong exhibitions of modern Maori and Pacific artists and issues. The Dowse has a bust of Carmen Rupe by Paul Rayner and significant collections of jewelry by Alan Preston.

=== Nuku Te Whatewha ===
In the early days of the Māori King movement, the Te Āti Awa chief Wi Tako Ngātata commissioned the Tūwharetoa tribe to build around seven pataka (storehouses) to be observed as "pillars of the kingdom". Nuku Tewhatewha is the only one extant. It was constructed around 1853 at Naenae and carved by a nephew of Te Heuheu Tūkino IV. In 1856, Wi Tako sold land including the pataka at Te Mako, Naenae to William Beetham and vested the pataka to his care. In 1888 Beetham's son George moved the pataka to the garden of his home in Moturoa Street in Wellington In 1912 it was shifted to Brancepeth Station at Masterton and looked after by descendants of William Beetham. (Note: One source states that the pataka was taken to London for a time and that the Dominion Museum tried to buy it back) In 1982 William Beetham's great-grandson Hugh Beetham decided that the pataka should be better protected, and offered it to the Dowse Art Gallery. It was transported over the Remutaka Hill Road by truck to a new wing in the museum. Then-director of the Dowse, James Mack, changed the name of the Dowse Art Gallery to the Dowse Art Museum mainly because of the donation of the pataka, stating that "it is the most important thing we have ever been given, and are ever likely to be given".

== Significant exhibitions ==
- Casting Light – Ann Robinson – 1998
- Thrift to Fantasy – Rosemary McLeod – 2003
- Respect – Hip Hop Aotearoa – DLT, Upper Hutt Posse, Doug and Joella Wright, and Chris Graham, aka Science – 2003
- Fruits Tokyo Street Style – Shoichi Aoki – 2004
- Bill Viola: The Messenger 2010
- Legacy: The Art of Rangi Hetet and Erenora Puketapu-Hetet - 2016. Included kākahu (cloaks) woven by Dame Rangimārie Hetet, Lillian Smallman Hetet and Veranoa Hetet.
- Gavin Hipkins: The Domain – 2017–2018
