= Ann Verdcourt =

New Zealand sculptor and ceramicist (1934–2022)

Ann Verdcourt (1934–2022) was a New Zealand artist. She emigrated to New Zealand with her husband, ceramic artist John Lawrence, in 1965.

== Education ==
Verdcourt studied at the Luton School of Art from 1948 to 1952 and completed a NDD Diploma (sculpture and Ceramics) at the Hornsey School of Art in London in 1955.

== Career ==
Verdcourt has been working with clay since the 1950s. Following a period of working and exhibiting in NZ, for an exhibition at Manawatu Art Gallery in the early 1980s called, Still Life is Still Alive she was asked "to provide a large number of pottery vessels in the style of Morandi so that students and members of the public could be encouraged to draw and paint from them in the gallery space." This event has charted her course since then. Her work references many other artists and art movements, drawing from her extensive knowledge of art history. In her work one can find allusions to anything from Diego Velázquez, Henri Matisse, Amedeo Modigliani and Constantin Brâncuși to the famous earthenware depiction of the Venus of Willendorf. "I do enjoy working from Portraits; it's a challenge bringing the image into three dimensions, discovering the profile and unknown views." This has been her forte - working to illustrate what can only be done in three dimensions.

In 1992 she was commissioned to produce work for the Treasures of the Underworld exhibition that formed part of the New Zealand Pavilion at the Seville Expo '92. She said of her work:

My brief was to make something about Columbus, something that would appeal to a wide range of people and be understood without the use of words. After much hesitation and after reading a great many books, I decided the only way I could tackle the subject was by treating it as an unfolding story of the "first Voyage".

== Exhibitions ==
A major exhibition of Verdcourt's work, Ceramics: Ann Verdcourt - a survey was jointly developed by Te Manawa, Palmerston North and the Sarjeant Gallery, Wanganui in 2010 and toured to other North Island galleries. A version of the exhibition, titled Ann Verdcourt: Still Lives 1980 – 2007 was shown at Objectspace in Auckland in 2011.

== Awards ==
Ann Verdcourt was the winner of the 'Non-functional' award for her work Thoughts of Vegetation in the New Zealand Society of Potters exhibition at the Royal Easter Show in 1995. In 2003, her work Play won a Merit Award in the Portage Ceramic Awards.

== Collections ==
Verdcourt has work in the collections of the Museum of New Zealand Te Papa Tongarewa, Wellington; the Auckland War Memorial Museum, Auckland; Te Manawa, Palmerston North; Sarjeant Gallery, Wanganui; the James Wallace Collection, Auckland; Hawke's Bay Museum, Napier; and The Dowse Art Museum, Lower Hutt.
