= James Mack (curator) =

James Mack (Galvan Kepler Macnamara; 1941 – 3 June 2004) was a curator, director, advisor and arts advocate in New Zealand and the Pacific.

== Career ==
Mack trained as a teacher at the Dunedin Teachers' Training College, specialising in arts and crafts teaching and spent several years on the South Auckland Education Board as an Arts and Crafts Advisor.

Between 1968 and 1971, he worked at the Dunedin Public Art Gallery as an assistant director. In 1972, he joined the newly amalgamated Waikato Museum and Art Gallery. There he curated the 1973 exhibition Taranaki Saw it All: The Story of Te Whiti O Rongomai of Parihaka, ‘stepping into a cross-cultural role that few had undertaken in the gallery environment of the time.’

In 1974, Mack began four years at the East West Centre in Honolulu as a Senior Fellow and visiting Research Associate. He then worked as a project manager for the Queen Elizabeth II Arts Council in the late 1970s.

=== Dowse Art Museum ===
James Mack was the director of The Dowse Art Museum in Lower Hutt between 1981 and 1988. Art historian Douglas Lloyd Jenkins writes 'Under the directorship of James Mack...The Dowse Art Museum in Lower Hutt championed New Zealand craft and repositioned the gallery as a repository of decorative rather than fine arts.' Mack redefined The Dowse's collection policy so that the focus was upon building a nationally and internationally significant collection of craft and applied art, including ceramics, jewellery, glass and textile art. The Dowse also programmed exhibitions that celebrated a range of craft artists and their practices, such as Pakohe in 1986, which celebrated master craftsmen working in stone.

=== National Museum ===
In 1988, Mack moved into a public services role at the National Museum (now the Museum of New Zealand Te Papa Tongarewa).

Mack curated Treasures of the Underworld, a glass and clay exhibition created for the New Zealand pavilion at the 1992 Seville Expo. The exhibition featured 48 works by top New Zealand craft practitioners and was themed to celebrate the 500th anniversary of Christopher Columbus’ first voyage to America.

== Later life ==
Mack retired to the Wairarapa, establishing a small gallery in Featherston. At the age of 60, he changed his name to Galvan Macnamara, his father's name. A Spiral documentary about Mack and his life, titled Sister Galvan, was released in 2004 and attracted praise from viewers, including Dame Gaylene Preston, who wrote "I LOVED it. It is very rich and thought provoking. Well, Sister Galvan is thought provoking, the film is thoughtful–every frame. It has a lovely look to it. I really like documentaries that are personal like this and I think you have exploited the possibilities of NOT having to put it on the free to air network. It is something which will get to be more and more valuable as time goes on."

Mack died on 3 June 2004, aged 63. An obituary by New Zealand craft advocate Edith Ryan described as a 'very gifted, quixotic man' who 'put the whole weight of his passion and drive behind the craft creators of this country'.

The Hocken Collections holds archival material covering nearly 40 years of Mack's life.
