= Flock mill, Lower Hutt =

Mill building in New Zealand

Coordinates: 41°12′39″S 174°56′13″E

A flock mill existed on the banks of the Waiwhetū Stream in Lower Hutt, New Zealand, for about fifty years from the late 1890s to the 1940s.

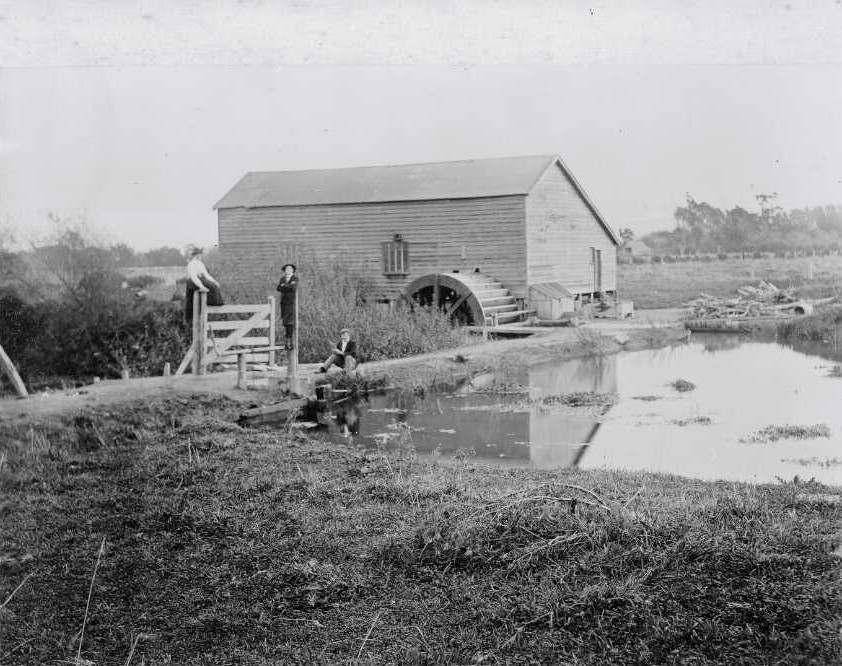
The flock mill with water wheel prior to the 1901 fire

The mill was located at the intersection of what is now Rumgay Street and Riverside Drive, on land owned by Samuel Smart Mason who had farmed in the area for many years. Mason built the mill in 1894. He dammed the Waiwhetū Stream to raise the water level by 10 inches and installed a breastshot water wheel powered by water going over the dam as a source of mechanical power. The mill produced flock: waste textiles such as old clothes and rags, pieces of carpet and cloth bags were chopped up finely to produce a fluffy material that was then used to stuff upholstery items such as mattresses or sofas.

John Ellis and his wife Edith Dorothy settled in the Hutt Valley around 1895, and by 1896 were operating the flock mill in partnership with John's brother William Henry Ellis. In 1898 Ellis decided that the water level at the weir was not high enough, so he asked his upstream neighbour Elizabeth Thoms for permission to increase the height of the dam to raise the water level by 20 inches. Ellis paid Thom's son to raise up an existing small bridge on Thom's land and put in a stopbank. Thoms would later allege that the dam had caused damage to her property.

In November 1900 William Ellis left the partnership and thereafter the business was continued by John.

A fire destroyed the uninsured factory on 30 April 1901. John Eilis and Walter Webb finished work at the mill late at night, but before leaving set fire to some fluff near the machine that converted the rags into flock. They carried the burning fluff outside, but it was thought that some fire remained and ignited flammable material inside the building. Another theory was that rags may have ignited matches inside the old clothes used to make the flock. It was stated that "an incredible quantity" of matches was left behind in old garments supplied to the mill for turning into flock. The fire caused £200 of losses to John Ellis and £500 of losses to Samuel Mason. Mason clarified to media that he was not involved at all in the flock mill business.

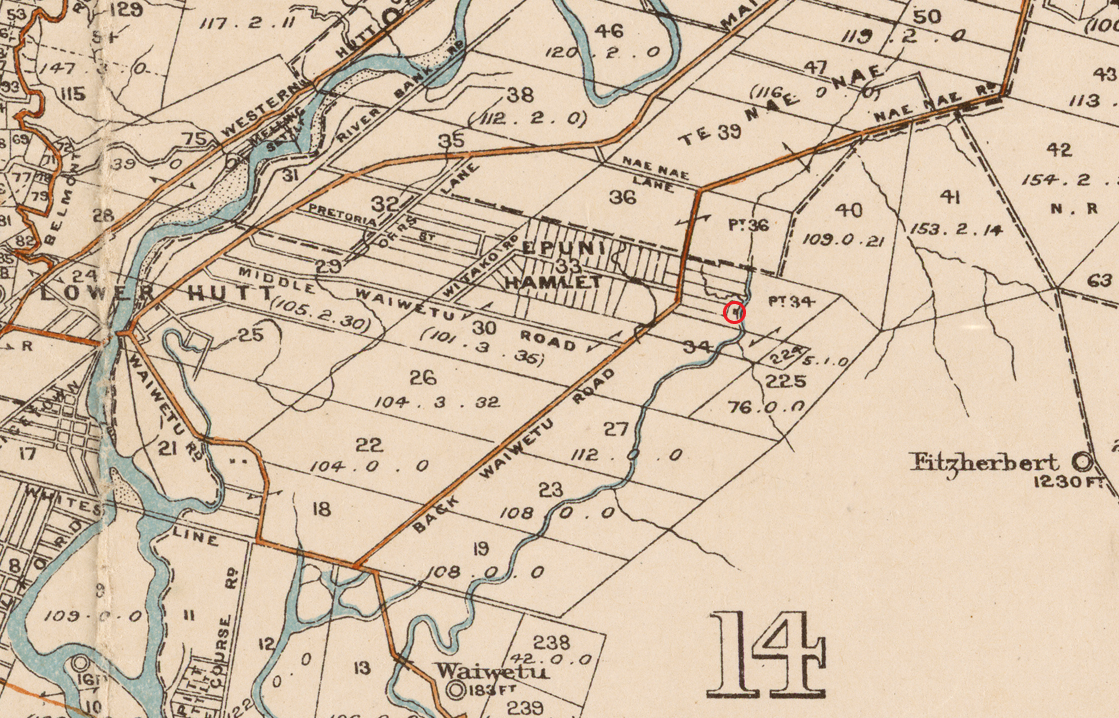
1909 survey map showing the location of the mill on the Waiwhetū Stream

Ellis rebuilt and expanded the factory. In 1907, Mason sold the mill and the land on both sides of the stream where the mill stood to Edith Ellis. The Ellises sold the land to the east of the stream to Charles White in 1930.

On 11 December 1909, Hutt County Council issued a notice to John Ellis to remove the dam. This was the beginning of over a year of litigation widely reported in the news at the time. Karl Rasmussen, a farmer further upstream, claimed £250 in damages for slips caused by the dam, damage to drainage, and a small area of flooding on his property. The case was heard at the Supreme Court in March and June 1910, with evidence from engineers and local farmers including Samuel Mason to the effect that "the dam did not wrongfully obstruct the natural flow of the water in the stream, that it did not cause the water to erode Rasmussen's land, or cause appreciable damage". The Ellises argued that they were entitled to keep the dam and that if it was removed, their business would be destroyed. The case proceeded to the Court of Appeal in October 1910. While the Rasmussen case was proceeding, Eleanor Thoms took the Ellises to court in May 1910. Like Rasmussen, she claimed damage was caused to her property by the dam, but her case was dismissed since it appeared that she had approved the raising of the dam height in 1898.

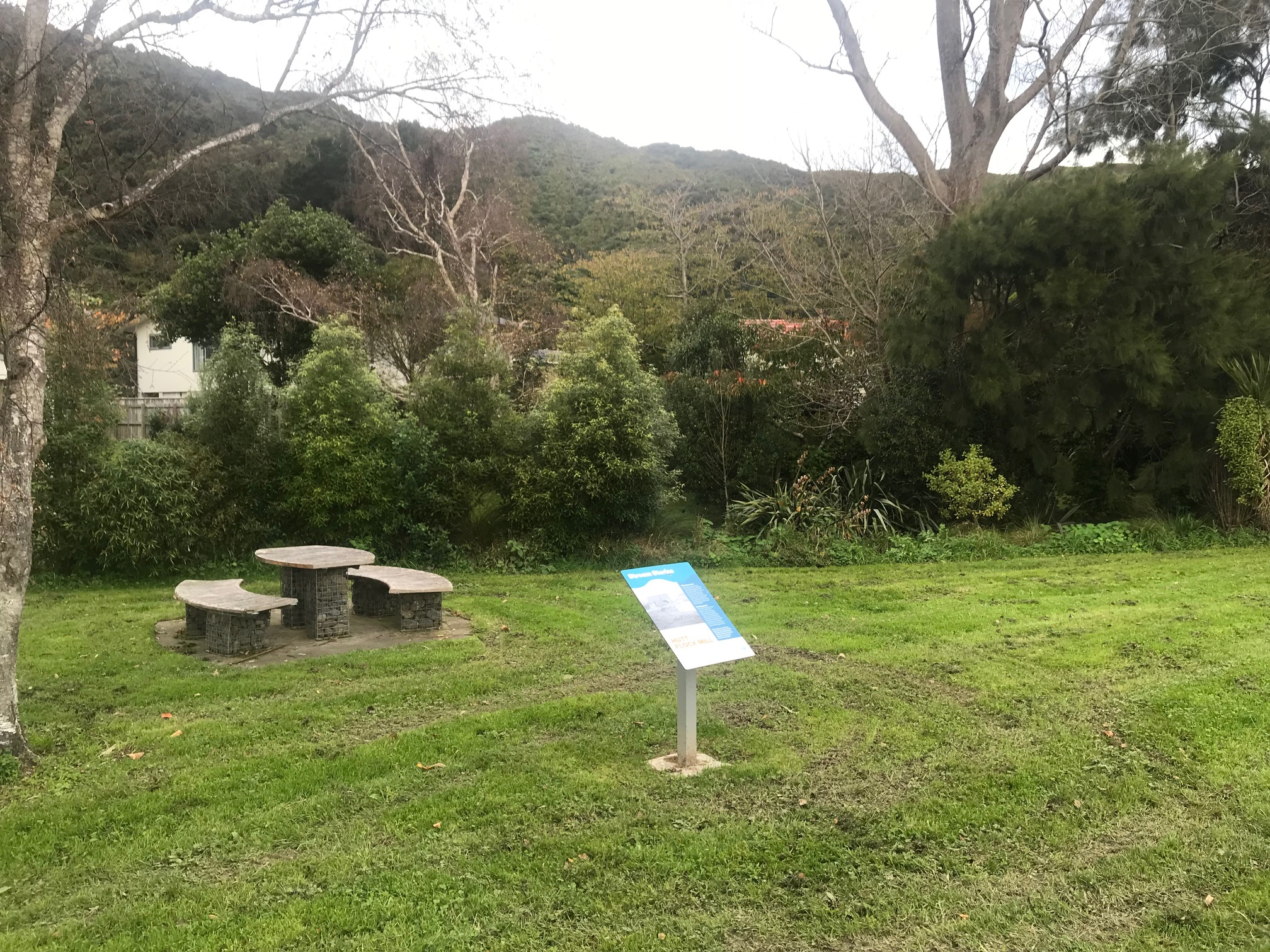
An information board commemorates the mill

The dam remained in place until at least 1930. In 1928 the company was registered as a new company, Hutt Flock Mills Ltd, which stated it would import flock and kapok and manufacture mattresses. John Ellis died in March 1931. In August 1931, there was another fire at the mill. Stock in a storeroom was destroyed but other buildings on the site were saved. The company was still recycling old fabric into flock in 1933, but ceased business that year. The company was relaunched by John and Edith's son Phillip in 1935, and in 1937 a new factory was built in corrugated asbestos cement. However the mill closed in June 1939 and the company was struck off in 1940. The land was sold to George Provost in April 1940, and in October 1941 was taken by the Crown for housing purposes.

In 1949 a local resident wrote to Lower Hutt City Corporation about the water wheel from the mill, which at that time was stored behind Garth Tiles' premises in Rumgay Street. The clerk of the Hutt River Board stated:

The wheel is certainly very old and not in a good state of repair, and is situated in a by-pass of an old dam and not in Waiwhetu Stream. Evidently years ago the stream was fitted with a floodgate which allowed a lake to form, and concrete channels were constructed to allow a flow from the lake to the wheel. This dam has long since been removed and the property of the old Flock Mill acquired by the Government for Housing Purposes.

The derelict mill buildings were demolished in 1958. An information board about the mill stands on Riverside Drive near the site of the mill.
