= Treasures of the Underworld =

Exhibitioni n the New Zealand pavilion of Seville Expo '92

Treasures of the Underworld was an exhibition featured in the New Zealand pavilion of Seville Expo '92.

== The exhibition ==
The exhibition featured 48 works, comprising a total of 399 individual pieces. It was extremely successful with over half a million visitors to New Zealand's Pavilion, making it the most-visited exhibition of New Zealand art to that time.

The exhibition was curated by the art curator James Mack and featured commissions completed by New Zealand's top practitioners of object art in glass and clay at that time.

The artists who contributed works were:

- Len Castle
- Ann Robinson
- Steve Fullmer
- Ann Verdcourt
- Darryl Robertson
- Christine Boswijk
- Richard Parker
- Barry Brickell
- Paerau Corneal
- Brian Gartside
- Julia van Helden
- Christine Hellyar
- Chester Nealie
- Robyn Stewart

== Exhibition theme ==
The theme of the commissions was the celebration of the 500th anniversary of Christopher Columbus's first voyage to America. This emphasis on voyage and discovery influenced the artists to explore the connections with New Zealand and the familiar world of the South Pacific. James Mack urged each artist to stretch both materials and technique beyond Eurocentric influences.

== Influence ==
The interest the works generated came as a surprise. Ian Fraser the Commissioner at the NZ Expo said

We were overwhelmed by the enthusiasm of the response....

The work produced for this exhibition has and continues to influence the development of object art in New Zealand. The success of the exhibition also boosted the profile of ceramic and glass artists in New Zealand.

After a personal request from Queen Beatrice of Holland, the exhibition toured to Die Nieuwe Kerk, Amsterdam, Holland, before returning to New Zealand for a nationwide tour.

After the tours were complete the artworks were accessioned into the permanent collection of the New Zealand National Art Gallery - now the Museum of New Zealand Te Papa Tongarewa.
