= Lower Hutt War Memorial Library =

Public library in Lower Hutt, New Zealand

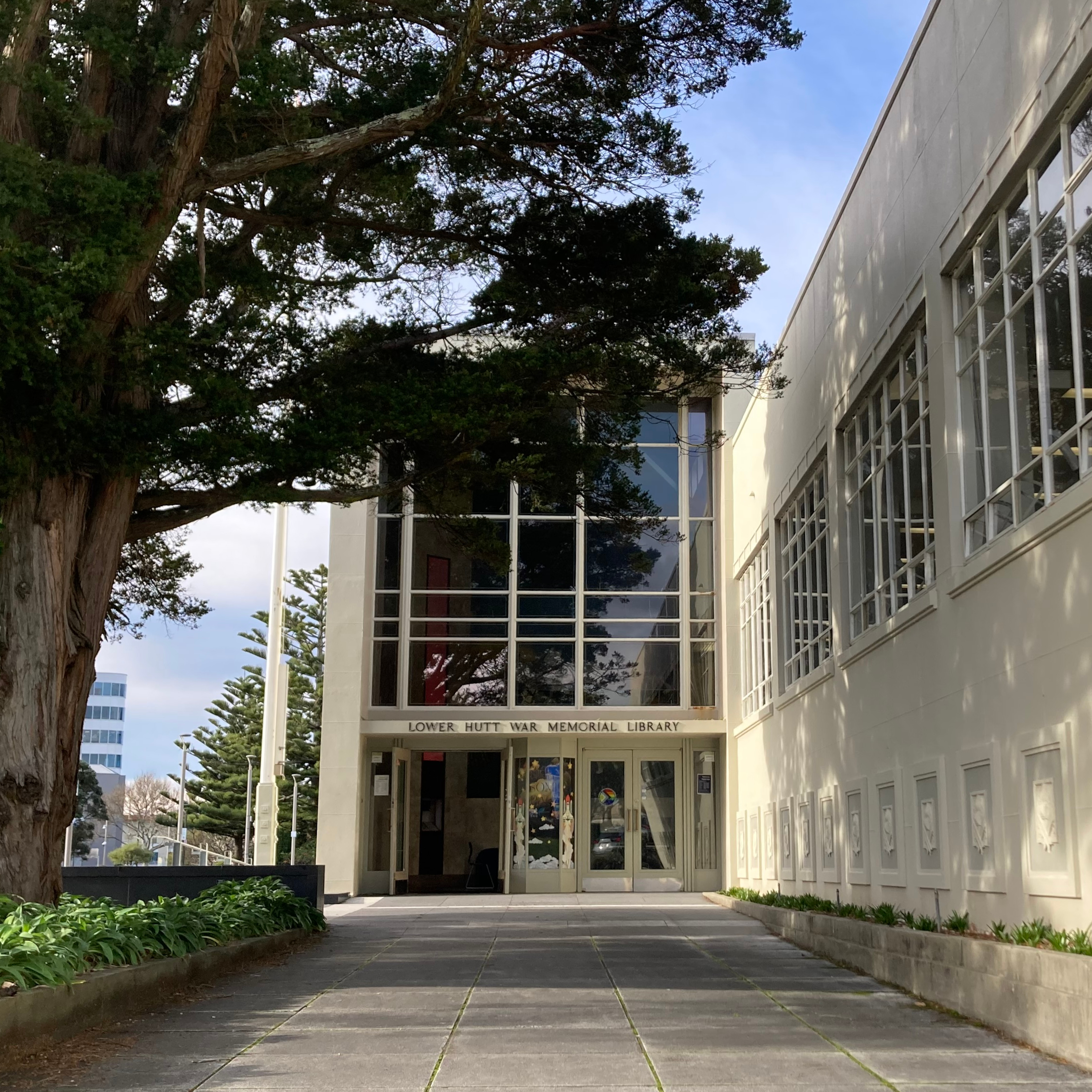
- Queen Street entrance
- 41.212238°S 174.900874°E
- Location: Lower Hutt, New Zealand
- Type: Public library
- Established: 1956
- Architect: Ron Muston
- Branch of: Hutt City Library Services

The Lower Hutt War Memorial Library is a building in Lower Hutt, New Zealand, that houses that city's central library. The public library system of the city of Lower Hutt identifies the library collection within the building as the "War Memorial Library".

John William Andrews, the Mayor of Lower Hutt from 1933 to 1947, initiated planning for a civic complex in Lower Hutt. His successor Percy Dowse, who was mayor from 1950 to 1970, oversaw the implementation of the various projects.

The library building was constructed from 1952 to 1956. It typifies many of the community projects completed in New Zealand as memorials after World War II (1939–1945), in contrast to the statues and cenotaphs more commonly erected following World War I (1914–1918). It was part of a town planning concept that resulted in four civic buildings adjacent to Riddiford Park: a church (St James's Church), a library, a town hall complex, and a horticultural hall. Ron Muston was the designer for St James's Church, which opened in 1953, and he was commissioned to design the library in a style complementary to the church. The library opened in 1956 at a cost of NZ£200,000, double its initial cost estimate.

Distinctive features of the library building include murals by artist Leonard Mitchell – 'Their Sacrifice', 'Preserved Freedom' and 'Human Endeavour'.

On 13 June 2003, the New Zealand Historic Places Trust (now known as Heritage New Zealand) added the Lower Hutt Civic Centre Historic Area to the historic areas register of the Wellington Region, with registration number 7520.
