= Puketapu =

Puketapu may refer to:

== People ==
- Īhāia Puketapu (1887–1971), Te Āti Awa leader
- Jean Puketapu (1931–2012), Māori language activist
- Kara Puketapu (1934–2023), public servant and Te Āti Awa leader
- Priyani Puketapu (born 1990), beauty queen
- Erenora Puketapu-Hetet (1941–2006), weaver

== Places ==
- Puketapu, Hawke's Bay
- Puketapu (Otago), a hill above Palmerston
