= Wastewater infrastructure in the Wellington Region =

Wastewater infrastructure is one of the main systems that deliver water supply and sanitation in the Wellington Region. Properties in urban areas within the Wellington Region are generally all connected to a wastewater system via a gravity sewer. Pumps are used to supplement the gravity sewers, by pumping wastewater to a treatment plant, or by lifting wastewater from lower level drains into a higher elevation gravity sewer so that it can flow to a treatment plant.

== History ==
Map showing typhoid cases in Te Aro, 1890-1892

After Wellington became the capital city in 1865, the population grew quickly. Cases of typhoid and cholera emerged that were attributed to poor city sanitation. In 1879 there were 75 deaths in Wellington from typhoid, diphtheria, scarlet fever, measles and cholera – mostly in the central Te Aro area. In 1893, construction started on a city wastewater network. It was completed by 1899 at a cost of £175,000.

As part of the early development of the wastewater network in Wellington City, a large pipe was constructed to carry wastewater from Manners Street in the central city, through Mount Victoria and out to an ocean outfall at Moa Point on the south coast. This main trunk wastewater line, known as "the interceptor", was extended through to Pipitea Street as the city's population reached 100,000. As suburban development spread north to Johnsonville, a further extension of the interceptor was constructed from Ngauranga Gorge and through the Ngaio Gorge to connect at Thorndon.

When wastewater networks were first installed, they generally discharged untreated wastewater to the coastal marine environment. Treatment of wastewater in the Wellington metropolitan area began with the installation of fine screening at Seaview and Moa Point in the 1980s. The discharge of untreated sewage at Moa Point became an election issue in the 1986 local government elections in Wellington City. Jim Belich campaigned with a promise to end the discharge of untreated sewage at Moa Point. He was elected as mayor of Wellington, despite having no previous experience as an elected official and was re-elected in 1989. A secondary treatment plant for the Porirua catchment was constructed at Titahi Bay in the late 1980s. Secondary treatment was installed at Moa Point, Seaview and the Western Karori plants between 1996 and 2002.

== Regional catchments ==
There are four separate wastewater catchments in the Wellington metropolitan area:

- Wellington city (extending as far north as Johnsonville)
- Porirua (from northern Johnsonville to Pukerua Bay)
- Karori
- Hutt Valley

The catchments drain mostly via gravity, but there are approximately 170 wastewater pumping stations.

== Wastewater treatment plants ==
There are four wastewater treatment plants in the Wellington metropolitan area, one for each of the catchments.

Catchment	Treatment plant location
Wellington city	Moa Point
Porirua	Rukutane Point, Tītahi Bay
Karori	Western Karori
Hutt Valley, including Wainuiomata	Seaview

Together, the four treatment plants treat about 150 million litres of wastewater on a typical day, using biological and ultraviolet treatment processes. The treated water is discharged to the sea. The sludge resulting from filtration and treatment is de-watered (with this water further treated) and the solid content is sent to landfills.

There are also wastewater treatment plants in the Wairarapa at Masterton, Carterton, Featherston, Greytown, Martinborough and Lake Ferry.

=== Moa Point treatment plant ===
The Moa Point treatment plant handles all the wastewater from most of Wellington city, other than Karori and some northern suburbs. In 1995 Wellington City Council contracted British company Anglian Water International to provide a sewage treatment plant for Wellington at Moa Point, at a cost of $149 million. The facility opened officially in September 1998. The treatment process has several steps: liquid is screened to remove solids, then goes through settling tanks. After treatment with an agent to separate out bacteria, the liquid is treated with ultraviolet light to eliminate most remaining bacteria and viruses. The treated water is then discharged to the ocean in Cook Strait via a 1.8-kilometre-long (1.1 mi) marine outfall pipe. Sludge is separated from the wastewater at the plant, and pumped at high pressure over a 9 kilometres (5.6 mi) route from Moa Point to the landfill at Carey’s Gully, where it is dewatered and placed into a landfill.

The plant can discharge up to 260,000 cubic metres of wastewater per day. During periods of heavy rainfall the volume of wastewater coming in sometimes gets too high and the plant may need to discharge partly treated sewage into the ocean. If this happens warning notices are displayed at Moa Point and Lyall Bay and are notified online.

In November 2021, Wellington City Council announced that it was considering installing a new technology thermal drying plant at Moa Point to treat sewage sludge. The benefits of this project would be to eliminate the current process of pumping sewage sludge from Moa Point to the landfill at Carey’s Gully, and reduce the amount of sludge going into the landfill by 80%. The original estimated project cost was in the range $160m – $220m. The funding of the project was proposed to come from additional levies on residential and commercial properties. The construction proceeded, but by August 2025, the estimated final cost had risen to over $500 million.

==== 2026 plant failure ====
On 4 February 2026, there was a complete failure of the Moa Point treatment plant when wastewater backed up and flooded the facility. Wellington Water stated that the plant would be out of service for an extended period and that it could take months to repair. Around 70 million litres per day of untreated sewage was discharged into a short ocean outfall at Tarakena Bay. The public were warned to stay away from beaches on the Wellington south coast. Wellington mayor Andrew Little described the failure as an environmental disaster. On 6 February, Wellington Water advised that they had been able to divert wastewater flows into the 1.8 km (1.1 mi) ocean outfall pipe into Cook Strait, and provide milliscreening. The capacity was limited to 900 litres per second, and inflows beyond this level would be discharged at Tarakena Bay. The risk to public health on the south coast remained. Little and Government ministers, including Prime Minister Christopher Luxon and Local Government Minister Simon Watts, have agreed that an independent inquiry into the plant's failure is needed.

In early October 2026, the Greater Wellington Regional Council filed criminal charges against both water services company Tiaki Wai and the Wellington City Council over their handling of the Moa Point wastewater spillage. As the successor to Wellington Water, Tiaki Wai inherited its predecessor's responsibilities and liabilities.

== Wastewater pipeline age and condition ==
=== Wellington catchment ===
The 2018/19 National Performance Review published by Water New Zealand compares the average wastewater pipeline age and condition across networks. The data for the Wellington Water network shows that 33% of the pipelines are in poor or very poor condition. The Wellington wastewater network ranks the worst on this measure out of the six large networks nationwide. (The next worst is Christchurch, with only 12% in poor or very poor condition). The review also includes average pipeline age. The Wellington wastewater network has an average age of 53 years, and ranks as the second oldest of the six large networks.

==== Performance - Wellington catchment ====
In March 2020, Wellington Water reported the discovery of severe corrosion in the large main trunk sewer (the interceptor) over a length of 250 m in a section close to the treatment plant near Moa Point. Work commenced on re-lining the affected section of the interceptor in April.

===== Ōwhiro Bay sewage pollution =====
Ōwhiro Bay is located on the Wellington south coast. The shoreline is within the Taputeranga Marine Reserve. There have been persistent problems with sewage pollution of the Ōwhiro Stream and beach for at least ten years, and the beach has been closed for swimming for long periods.

In March 2020, Wellington Water announced that it had found and resolved incorrect connections of wastewater into stormwater systems at five locations in a suburb in the stormwater catchment area of the Ōwhiro Stream. Wellington Water said that the mistake occurred when the subdivision was built about eight years ago, and there were likely to be more cross-connections that it had yet to identify.

===== Pipeline collapse in Dixon St =====
On 20 December 2019, a wastewater pipe built in the 1930s collapsed beneath the intersection of Willis and Dixon Streets in the central business district, leading to the diversion of untreated wastewater into Wellington harbour at an initial rate of up to 100 litres a second. The broken pipe serves much of the central city, taking wastewater to the interceptor (or main trunk sewer), that leads to the Moa Point wastewater treatment plant. The public were warned not to swim in the inner harbour, but local iwi placed a rāhui on the entire Wellington harbour.

An emergency above-ground pipe was placed along Upper Willis street—closing it to all traffic—to bypass the failed underground pipe while permanent repairs were made. The swimming restriction on the whole of Wellington Harbour was lifted on 26 December. However, the area of the inner harbour from the Whairepo Lagoon entrance past the dive platform to the Clyde Quay wharf remained off-limits because of a "separate network issue".

Willis Street was eventually re-opened at the end of March 2020, after the permanent replacement had been installed beneath the road, and the temporary above-ground pipe removed.

===== Failure of sludge pipeline beneath Mt Albert =====
In January 2020, there was a failure of pipelines carrying sludge pumped at high pressure from the Moa Point treatment plant to the landfill at Carey’s Gully. The pipelines are 9 km long and are about 25 years old. There are two in parallel allowing one to operate while maintenance can occur on the other pipe. In this incident both pipes failed at the same time.

To avoid discharging the sludge into the ocean, a fleet of sewage trucks was mobilized to carry about one million litres of sludge a day to the dewatering plant at Carey’s Gully. Up to 150 round trips each day were required, with trucks sometimes operating around the clock to keep up with the volume. Some local residents were impacted by the increased heavy traffic and smells from the trucks.

The break in the pipelines was located 200 m inside a sewage tunnel beneath Mt Albert, making repairs a significant challenge. The repair solution required the manufacture in Germany of a custom-made polyester woven liner. This liner was winched from one end of each pipe to the other, and then expanded to essentially act as a new pipeline within the old one. Specialists from the manufacturer flew to New Zealand to assist in the installation, but were required to spend 14 days in isolation because of the border restrictions imposed in response to the COVID-19 pandemic.

In April, Wellington City Council agreed to borrow $16 million to fund repairs to the sludge pipelines, together with the on-going costs of transporting sludge via truck from the Moa Point treatment facility to the landfill site while the repairs were carried out. On 24 May, Wellington Water announced that the first of the two sludge pipelines had been repaired and put into service, allowing the sludge trucking operations to end.

=== Porirua catchment ===
Wastewater from the northern suburbs of Wellington and from Porirua city as far north as Pukerua Bay is treated at a wastewater treatment plant (WWTP) located at Rukutane Point to the south-west of Titahi Bay beach. There is an ocean outfall adjacent to the plant. The WWTP was officially opened in September 1989, ending the continuous discharge of untreated wastewater that had occurred at Rukutane Point since the sewage network was constructed in 1951.

The catchment area includes pipe networks owned by Wellington City Council in northern Johnsonville, Paparangi, northern Newlands, Woodridge, Grenada, Churton Park and Tawa. Sewage mains from the boundary between Wellington and Porirua City Council areas to the treatment plant are jointly owned by the two councils.

==== Performance - Porirua catchment ====
As part of a submission to a Porirua City Council committee in 2018 in relation to renewing resource consents, Wellington Water provided a background document about the issues in the Porirua wastewater system. The issues reported included:

- poor existing freshwater quality in the Porirua catchment
- frequent overflows from wastewater networks into freshwater and coastal water during periods of wet weather, and overflows from the wastewater treatment plant into coastal water
- inflow and infiltration from stormwater into the wastewater network
- ageing network prone to failures and with insufficient capacity to accommodate future growth
- insufficient capacity of the treatment plant to accommodate future growth

===== Wastewater network overflows during storms =====
Discharges from the wastewater network can occur from multiple overflow points in the network. There are 20 overflow points built into the network. Discharge of untreated sewage from these overflow points occurs when the total flow exceeds the capacity of pipes and pumping stations, typically during periods of heavy rain or where there is large amounts of infiltration from groundwater. Wastewater overflows also occur from manholes in some cases. These discharges cause pollution of waterways, harbour, and beaches, and create public health hazards.

In February 2020, the mayor of Porirua announced the establishment of a roving team to search for issues such as cross connections in stormwater and sewage pipes that contribute to overflows and pollution of waterways.

In August 2021, Porirua City Council approved a process to designate land adjacent to State Highway 1 and the North Island Main Trunk railway for the construction of a $42.9 million wastewater tank. The facility intercepts high flows during storms and temporarily store wastewater until it can be pumped to the treatment plant. This reduces the risk of overflows from pipes, pumping stations and the wastewater treatment plant. The storage tank is part of the long term strategy for reduction in wastewater overflows published in November 2019. The strategy includes additional but lower priority storage tanks at north Plimmerton, Paremata, Whitby and north Wellington.

In June 2024, Wellington Water advised that there had been two instances in the year to date of overflows of untreated wastewater from the Rukutane Point pump station. The pumping station lifts wastewater to the nearby treatment station, but its capacity is insufficient to handle peak inflows, causing overflow into Titahi Bay after heavy rain. Porirua City Council agreed in June to re-prioritise funding to enable an upgrade in pump capacity at Rukutane Point.

===== Wastewater pipe failures =====
In July 2021, a wastewater main on State Highway 1 failed twice, and another failure occurred when a cross-harbour pipeline was put into service. These failures led to sewage pollution of Porirua Harbour. The initial failure occurred during heavy rain. Wellington Water said that the pipeline on State Highway 1 was in a fragile condition and a long term fix would take months to complete. Ngāti Toa placed a two-week rāhui on Porirua Harbour.

===== Illegal discharge from Porirua WWTP =====
In October 2018, a series of errors and omissions in the management of the Porirua WWTP led to a spill of approximately 5000 cubic metres of wastewater and solids from the outfall at Rukutane Point adjacent to Titahi Bay beach. In a subsequent hearing in the Environment Court in September 2019, Wellington Water was fined $67,500 for the illegal discharge.

===== Titahi Bay beach pollution =====
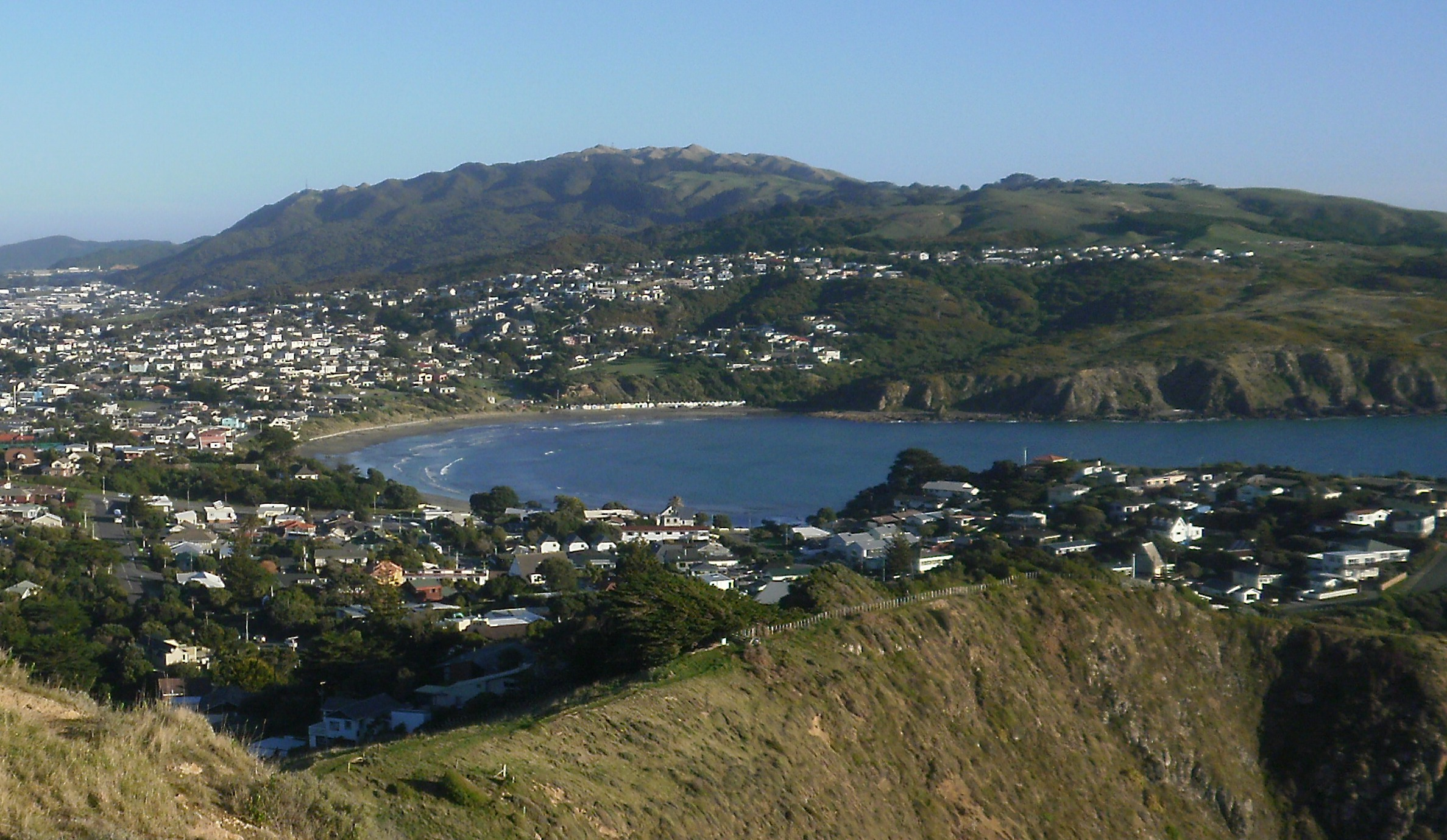
Titahi Bay viewed from Whitireia Park

The maximum hydraulic capacity of the WWTP as at 2020 is 1,000 litres per second. However, peak flows into the plant during storm events in 2018 were recorded at 1,275 litres per second, leading to overflows where some wastewater bypasses some of the treatment stages. There were 12 such bypass events in 2020. Each bypass event results in the discharge of some untreated wastewater at the outfall adjacent to Titahi Bay. Planned upgrades to the WWTP would boost capacity to 1,500 litres per second.

Warning signs were posted at Titahi Bay beach in late February 2020, warning against swimming because water quality monitoring had revealed high levels of faecal coliforms. The water at the beach was deemed unsafe for recreational use, including for swimming, fishing or collecting seafood. A further beach closure notice was posted in mid-March 2020.

Contamination caused by overflows, damaged pipes or cross-connections often produce only intermittent pollution, and the causes of pollution can lie undetected for years. Tracking such faults can be time-consuming and costly, and must be prioritised against other work. However, the Porirua City Council decided to establish a roving water quality team to specifically search for causes of sewage pollution arising from network faults.

Titahi Bay beach was still considered unsafe for swimming on 30 April 2020. However, Wellington Water reported that they had located a plumbing fault in the catchment feeding into Titahi Bay beach and were working to get this fixed. Titahi Bay beach was closed from February until June 2020 as a result of continuing sewage pollution from multiple sources with levels of E.coli measured at 300 times the level considered safe for swimming.

In January and March 2021, the ultraviolet disinfection stage at the wastewater treatment plant failed, leading to effluent that had not been disinfected being discharged at Rukutane Point. Local residents including the Tītahi Bay Surf Life Saving Club complained about the failure, and also the lack of warnings given to swimmers.

==== WWTP discharge consent renewal 2023 ====
The discharge consent for the Porirua wastewater treatment plant expired on 6 July 2020. In April 2020, Wellington Water (on behalf of Porirua City Council) submitted an application to Greater Wellington Regional Council (GWRC) for a 20 year renewal of the consent. New consent applications are normally submitted six months before the existing consent expires, but Wellington Water was allowed until 6 April "given the volume and complexity of information" required. The consent application and supporting documents were published by GWRC in December 2020. The consent application was formally notified to the public on 25 May 2021, and public submissions closed on 28 July 2021. In November 2021, Wellington Water stated that they had paused the consent application because of performance issues with the wastewater treatment plant. In June 2023, a panel of commissioners reviewing the consent application on behalf of Greater Wellington Regional Council granted an 18 year renewal, despite overwhelming opposition in written submissions. The new consent increases the permitted daily discharge of treated sewage from an average of 24,000 cubic metres (850,000 cu ft) to 36,000 cubic metres (1,300,000 cu ft), and imposes new conditions for monitoring and reporting.

===== Long term plan 2021-2051 =====
In February 2020, Porirua City Council revealed that more than half of Porirua's wastewater pipes are in a poor condition, and that it will cost close to $2 billion over the next two to three decades to bring them up to scratch.

In March 2021, the Porirua City Council published a draft long term plan for the period 2021-2051. In the covering note for the consultation, the Mayor Anita Baker said "There is no greater priority than investing in our critical 3 waters infrastructure - stormwater, wastewater and drinking water". The draft plan included expenditure of $800 million over 30 years on improving water infrastructure, with expenditure on wastewater forecast to be 15% of total rates.

In July 2021, it was announced that the government would provide funding of $136 million from its $3.8 billion Housing Acceleration Fund for upgrading sewerage, stormwater and other water infrastructure in Porirua East.

=== Karori catchment ===
A separate wastewater and treatment system serves the Karori (western) area. Treated wastewater is piped out to the South Coast.

=== Hutt Valley catchment ===
From 1959 until 2001, Wainuiomata had its own independent sewage treatment plant providing secondary treatment, with wastewater discharging to the Wainuiomata River.

Wastewater from the entire Hutt Valley was screened and then pumped without any further treatment via a 18.3 km (11.4 mi) pipeline to an ocean outfall near the harbour entrance at Pencarrow Head. The outfall pipeline is a re-inforced concrete rising main. It was commissioned in 1962, but has had a history of problems with joints failing. The route of the pipeline passes through the industrial area of Seaview, then beneath the narrow road that serves the communities of Lowry Bay, Days Bay and Eastbourne for 8 km (5.0 mi), and then along an unsealed road that was initially built for the construction of the pipeline. From Eastbourne it follows the eastern side of Wellington Harbour for 8 km (5.0 mi) to a short ocean outfall south of Pencarrow Head.

==== Seaview treatment plant ====
By the 1990s, the discharge of untreated sewage into the ocean had become environmentally unacceptable. Planning for a new sewage treatment plan began in the mid 1990s. In 1997, the Wainuiomata community was consulted over future options for their wastewater treatment, because the existing Wainuiomata plant was not able to comply with the emerging standards for discharge of effluent to the Wainuiomata River. One of the options was to connect Wainuiomata to the Hutt Valley wastewater treatment system that was in the planning stage at that time.

In 1998, tenders were called for a design, build and operate contract for a treatment plant to be built in Seaview that would provide secondary treatment of all sewage from the Hutt Valley and Wainuiomata. A contract was let in 1999, and the plant was commissioned in 2001 at a cost of $63 million. Wastewater from the Wainuiomata area is piped to the Hutt Valley through the Wainuiomata Tunnel, an abandoned road tunnel that was converted in 1980 to a utilities tunnel. In preparation for the commissioning of the new plant, some companies in the Hutt Valley had to make major reductions in their discharges of trade waste. In one case, a fish meal factory was discharging as much waste into the network as the combined waste from Wainuiomata and Upper Hutt.

In the period from 2021 to 2023 there were 111 complaints about a stench from the Seaview wastewater treatment plant affecting homes and businesses in the Seaview, Hutt Park and Gracefield area. The Greater Wellington Regional Council issued infringement notices and fines to Hutt City and Upper Hutt City Councils, Wellington Water and the plant operator Veolia for breach of consent conditions and abatement notices for “discharge of objectionable and offensive odour”. Wellington Water stated that a filter intended to reduce odours was being replaced.

==== Discharges to Waiwhetū Stream ====
In 2011, the Hutt City Council sought a 35 year consent for temporary discharges of treated effluent directly into the Waiwhetū Stream. These discharges would be required when maintenance was required on the main outfall pipeline. The temporary discharges cause pollution in the lower reaches of Waiwhetū Stream and in the estuary of the Hutt River, making it unsafe to collect shellfish, fish or swim in the area. The consent was opposed by the Friends of Waiwhetū Stream and local Māori.

==== Problems with the main outfall ====
In March 2022, Wellington Water reported a leak in the pipeline to the outfall, in the Seaview area. Repairs required the shutdown of the pipeline, and treated wastewater was discharged into the Waiwhetū Stream while the repairs were carried out. In September 2023, Wellington Water briefed the Upper Hutt and Lower Hutt City Councils about problems with the existing 18 km (11 mi) outfall pipe from Seaview to Pencarrow. The reported issues included unreliability of rubber joints in the pipeline, leading to the need to reduce operating pressure to reduce the risk of joints failing. When joints need to be repaired, the pipeline must be shutdown, and treated wastewater discharged into the Waiwhetū Stream while the repair is completed. It was forecast that pipeline shutdowns for repairs will become increasingly frequent, possibly rising to 30 times per year, with a typical repair time of 1 week. Wellington Water advised that the existing pipeline could be relined to allow it to operate at higher pressure, but that this would require discharge of treated sewage via a temporary outfall for an extended period. This option would not meet the needs of forecast increasing population in the Hutt Valley. Another option was a new pipeline in Wellington Harbour. The forecast costs of a new outfall pipeline were approximately $700 million, with a further $300 million required for upgrades to the treatment plant, including a replacement sludge drier.

In August 2024, there was a failure near a pumping station in Days Bay that caused a discharge of treated and untreated wastewater into the sea for several days, leading to the closure of beaches at Days Bay, Sunshine Bay and York Bay. The main outfall had to be shutdown to enable repairs, and this required the discharge of treated wastewater from the treatment plant into Waiwhetū Stream. There were protests from Taranaki Whānui and Te Ātiawa over the continuing discharges into the stream.

=== South Wairarapa ===
As at May 2022, the wastewater treatment plans serving Featherston, Greytown and Martinborough were all non-compliant, and in need of major investment.

==== Featherston ====
The underground wastewater pipe network in Featherston has significant issues with infiltration of stormwater, and this leads to pollution when there are overflows at the treatment plant. As at 2022, the wastewater scheme for Featherston discharges UV-treated wastewater to Donald's Creek and Lake Wairarapa and is operating under the terms of an extension to an expired resource consent. Lake Wairarapa is part of the Wairarapa Moana Wetlands, recognised in August 2020 as a wetland of international significance under the Ramsar Convention.

As part of efforts to reduce pollution of Lake Wairarapa caused by discharge of wastewater, the South Wairarapa District Council (SWDC) has been exploring alternative options. In 2017, the Council applied to the Greater Wellington Regional Council for resource consent for an alternative including disposal of treated wastewater to land, using irrigation. The council also purchased two plots of land, Hodders Farm and Featherston Golf Course, covering a total of 200 hectares (490 acres), as future sites for land-based discharge of treated wastewater. However, the plan was strongly opposed by some community groups, and in 2020 the SWDC decided not to proceed with the consent application. In 2022, short-listed options for a long-term solution for wastewater disposal were reported to range in cost from $30 million to $215 million.

==== Martinborough ====
The Martinborough wastewater plant usually discharges treated effluent to land using irrigation, but can also discharge to the Ruamāhanga River. Almost half a million litres of partially and fully treated wastewater was discharged into the Ruamāhanga River in two incidents in January 2020, as a result of issues at the treatment plant. Under suitable conditions, discharging fully treated wastewater to the river is a consented activity. However, when the river level is low, as in this case, this type of discharge is a breach of the resource consent.

A report issued in 2022 stated that the design of the scheme was insufficient to achieve compliance requirements, with breaches of consent conditions relating to the rate and quality of effluent discharge to both land and water. In May 2023, the South Wairarapa District Council announced a sudden halt on new connections to the sewage network, because the existing treatment plan was at the limits of its design capacity. The decision was expected to delay housing development in the town by two years.

==== Greytown ====
The wastewater scheme is designed to discharge to land and to surface water. A report issued in 2022 stated that the scheme was insufficient to meet compliance requirements.

==== Lake Ferry ====
In July 2020, the wastewater system serving the settlement was damaged during forestry operations, and residents were required to restrict wastewater for two days. The system uses discharge to a field. No discharge to waterways was reported. The estimated cost of repairs was $327,000.
