= Homedale =

Homedale may refer to:

- Homedale, Idaho, USA
- Homedale, New Zealand
