= Wainuiomata Regional Park =

Regional park in Greater Wellington, New Zealand

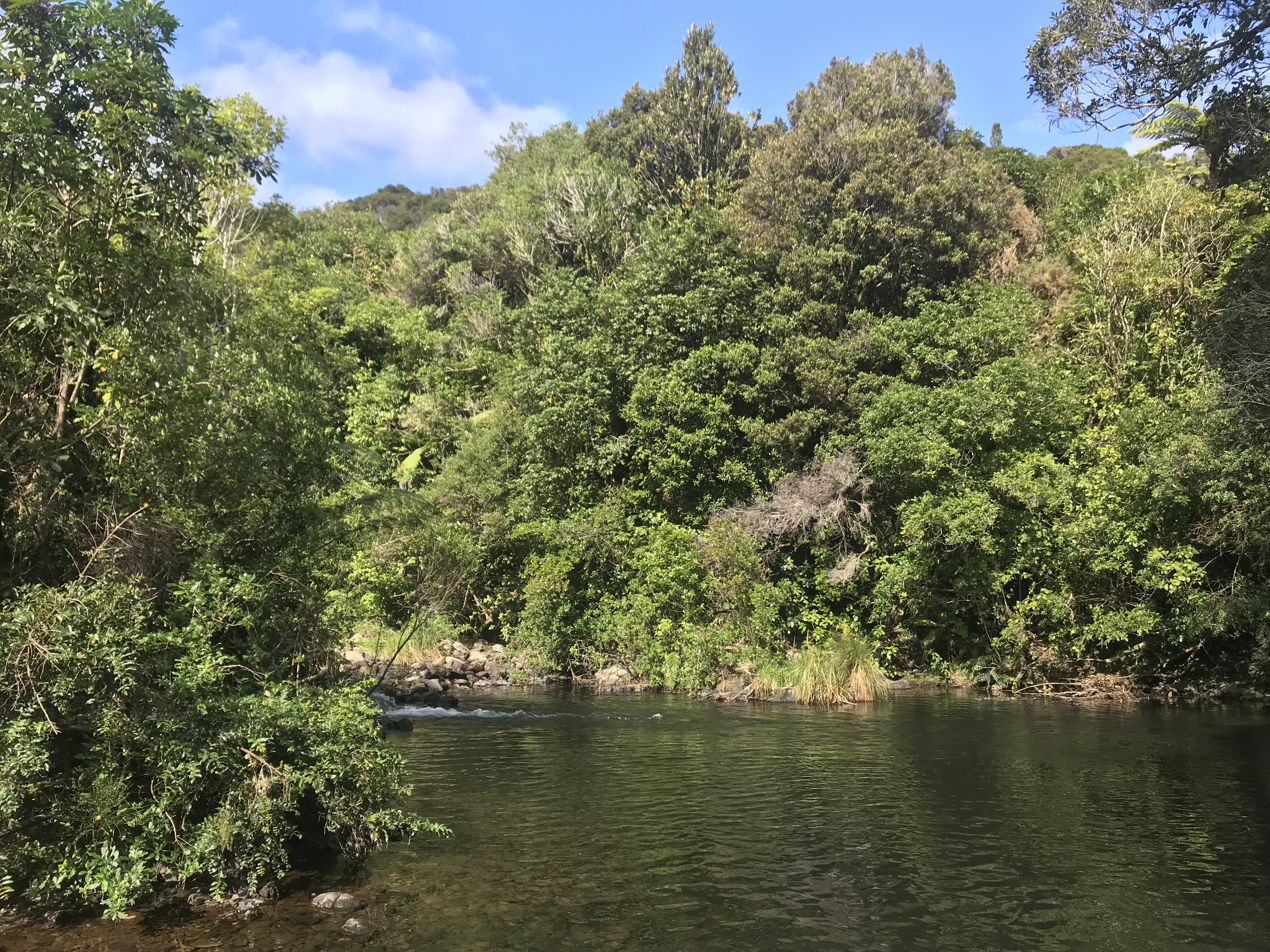
- Wainuiomata river and swimming hole
- Interactive map of Wainuiomata Regional Park
- Type: Regional park
- Location: Lower Hutt, Wellington Region, New Zealand
- Coordinates: 41.2792°S 174.9844°E
- Operator: Wellington Regional Council
- Open: 6am-6pm winter 6am-8pm summer
- Status: Open

Wainuiomata Regional Park is a regional park located near Wainuiomata, Lower Hutt in the Wellington Region of New Zealand. It is administered by Wellington Regional Council. The name of the park was changed from Wainuiomata Recreation Area to Wainuiomata Regional Park in January 2022.

There are kiwi living in the reserve.

== Geography ==
The Wainuiomata Regional Park is adjacent to one the largest areas of lowland native forests in the lower North Island. It adjoins the Wainuiomata Water Collection Area and Remutaka Forest Park.

== History ==
Māori used the hills and valleys of the area to travel between Wairarapa and Wellington Harbour.

In the mid-19th century, the Sinclair family and other European settlers logged the lower valley for timber, including the site of the current regional park.

Wellington Regional Council consulted on the future of the park in 2020.

=== Water collection area ===
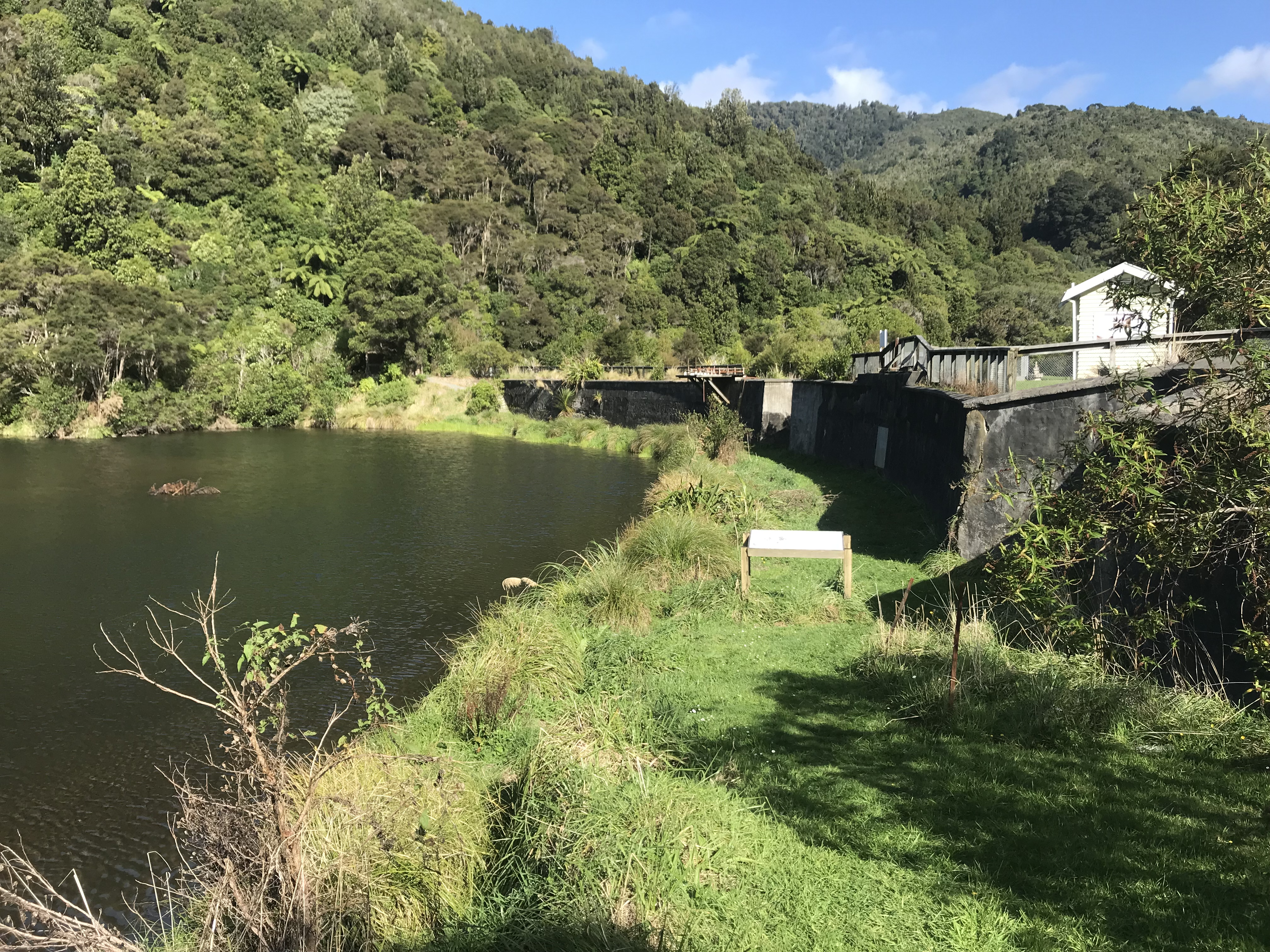
Historic Lower Dam on Waninuiomata River

In the 1880s, an earth dam and pipeline was established to collect fresh water from the Wainuiomata and Ōrongorongo Rivers. There are still remnants of the old logging tramways and old dam construction camp sites in the park. The rivers now provide about 15% of the region's drinking water.

A geological survey route was built in the 1970s, to investigate rock structures and the possibility of damning the Wainuiomata River. It is now open to the public as the Tana Umaga Track.

At the eastern edge of the reserve is a water museum and the Lower Dam. This area was flooded in 2007 to create a wetland.

== Native plant nursery ==
A native plant nursery was opened in the park in August 2021. The nursery was built and is operated by volunteers from Forest & Bird New Zealand, as project partners with Greater Wellington Regional Council. It can hold up to 12,000 seedlings of native species, including rimu, kahikatea, miro, mataī, rewarewa, coprosma, and carex.

== Recreation ==
The park includes a swimming spot and a range of walking tracks, featuring a swingbridge and footbridge.

There are two tracks which are suitable for a range of walkers, including parents with baby buggies:

- Lower Dam Walk (1 hour 20 minutes return), a track suitable for mountain bikers, cyclists, walkers and baby buggies which is also used by heavy vehicles
- Gums Loop Track (1 hour return), a track through gum trees, old dam construction houses and regenerating bush, crossing the river by a footbridge and a swingbridge

There are also three other tracks for walkers:

- Nikau Creek Track (1 hour return), a track upstream alongside the Nikau Creek, returning the same way
- Sledge Track (1 hour 30 mins return), a track through native bush, a flat planting site, a historic logging track and regenerating forest beside to the Sledge Track Creek, to a viewpoint across the Wainuiomata Valley, and then looping back
- Tana Umaga Track (1 hour 40 mins), a track with views of the Lower Dam and the upper Wainuiomata River valley

The park is open from 6am to 6pm during winter, and from 6am to 8pm during summer.
