= Kara Puketapu =

New Zealand public servant and Māori leader (1934–2023)

Secretary of Maori Affairs
- In office 1977–1983
- Preceded by: Ivan Apperley
- Succeeded by: Tamati Reedy

Personal details
- Born: Ihakara Porutu Puketapu; 26 February 1934 Waiwhetū, New Zealand
- Died: 7 July 2023 (aged 89)
- Spouse: Jean Puketapu (m. 1956; died 2012)
- Parent: Īhāia Puketapu (father)
- Relatives: Erenora Puketapu-Hetet (sister); Veranoa Hetet (niece)

Rugby union career
- Position: Second five-eighth
Provincial / State sides
Years	Team	Apps	(Points)
1955–1958	Wellington		
International career
Years	Team	Apps	(Points)
1955–1956	New Zealand Māori		
- Rugby league career

Coaching information
Club
Years	Team	Gms	W	D	L	W%
	Wainuiomata Lions
1995	Hutt Valley Hawks
	Total	0	0	0	0

Ihakara Porutu "Kara" Puketapu (26 February 1934 – 7 July 2023) was a New Zealand public servant and Māori leader. He served as Secretary of Maori Affairs and was later chair of Te Āti Awa based in Waiwhetū, Lower Hutt.

== Early life and education ==
Puketapu was born in Waiwhetū on 26 February 1934 to Īhāia Puketapu of the Te Āti Awa iwi and Taranaki-born Vera May Yeates, a Pākehā, who were both on their second marriages. He attended primary school in Waiwhetu and attended the Wellington Technical college. He then graduated with a degree in geography from Victoria University and followed up on his studies with a PhD at the University of New Mexico in cultural anthropology.

Puketapu grew up in Taranaki and rose through the ranks of the Ministry of Maori Affairs (later named the Ministry of Māori Affairs and ultimately Te Puni Kōkiri) to become Secretary of Maori Affairs.

== Professional career ==
In 1973, Puketapu was appointed chief administration officer with Foreign Affairs in the New Zealand House in London, Great Britain. He served in that position until 1975. In 1977, he became the secretary of Māori Affairs and Māori Trustee.

During his time as Secretary of Māori Affairs, Puketapu chaired the management committee of Te Maori, the international exhibition of Māori objects as art. In the United States, it was exhibited in 1984 in the Metropolitan Museum of Art, the Saint Louis Art Museum and the M.H. de Young Memorial Museum in 1985 and in the Field Museum of Chicago in 1986. Between 1986 and 1987, Te Maori toured New Zealand.

Puketapu also rose in standing within his iwi to become chairperson of the Te Āti Awa rūnanga (tribal council). In 2011, they clashed with local authorities over the custodianship of waka.

In 2008, Puketapu resigned from the Port Nicholson Block Treaty Settlement Trust chaired by Sir Ngatata Love over the compensation for Waiwhetū land confiscated by the Crown in the 1940s.

Puketapu is renowned for forging a new direction for the Department to empower Māori development in response to the difficulties being faced by Māori in the urban environment. Under his leadership, several Kōkiri units were established in the Wellington area. These units worked with local communities to devise programmes to support cultural and economic aspirations, thus reversing the normal "top down" approach of government departments. It was at one of these Kōkiri units in Wainuiomata that the first kōhanga reo was established. Puketapu's philosophy is outlined in his book Reform from Within.

== Rugby career ==
Puketapu was a rugby union player in his youth, playing for the New Zealand Māori team, and later became involved in coaching rugby league. Puketapu became involved with the Wainuiomata Lions both as a coach and as club president. With the Wainuiomata Lions, he won three national titles in the 1990s. During the 1995 Lion Red Cup, Puketapu briefly served as the coach of the Hutt Valley Hawks.

== Death ==
Puketapu died on 7 July 2023 at the age of 89.
