= Jean Puketapu =

Co-founder of the first kōhanga reo

Jean Gloria Edith Puketapu or Jean Puketapu-Waiwai QSO (26 July 1931 – 31 July 2012) was a New Zealand Ngāi Tūhoe Māori language native speaker and co-founder of the first kōhanga reo.

Puketapu was one of thirteen children of Haami and Te Ngaroahiahi Waiwai, shearers in the Ureweras near Lake Waikaremoana. She was beaten at Kokako Native School at Tuai for speaking Māori language and at home for speaking English, but obtained a scholarship to Hukarere College in Napier. At the age of 18, she moved to Lower Hutt with her sister and her husband, who was the son of Rua Tapunui Kēnana, the Māori prophet, faith healer and land rights activist.

She and her sisters became active in the Te Aroha Hutt Valley Association, particularly in the double long poi. Her mother, Te Ngaroahiahi, was one of the Tūhoe kuia who worked on tukutuku panels for Arohanui ki te Tangata, whose construction was spearheaded by Īhāia (Paddy) Puketapu. Jean married Ihakara Puketapu, Paddy's son, in 1956 and they moved to Wainuiomata.

While Ihakara was studying at the University of Chicago, Puketapu spent time in a project teaching women to read and write in a 'Negro ghetto'. When he returned from a posting to the New Zealand High Commission in London, Jean started work at Wainuiomata College teaching Māori, and helped to found the first kōhanga reo in 1981.

In 1989 a Winston Churchill Memorial Fellowship allowed her to travel to Arizona and New Mexico, studying curriculum methods and systems used in teaching the Spanish and Pueblo Indian languages.

In the 1991 Queen's Birthday Honours, Puketapu was appointed a Companion of the Queen's Service Order for community service. In 1993, she was awarded the New Zealand Suffrage Centennial Medal. In 1995 she became a Justice of the Peace, and in 2004 she received her Diploma in Early Childhood Education.

Two of her brothers, John and Bill, served in the 28th Māori Battalion during World War II.
