= Wainuiomata railway proposals =

Proposed railway in New Zealand

Multiple proposals have been made for a branch line railway to Wainuiomata as part of the Wellington commuter railway network. Despite strong local pressure at times during the 20th century, none of the proposals have come to fruition. There are currently (2021) no plans under consideration to build a rail line to Wainuiomata, although in 2021 a Christchurch-based property development company advertised townhouses in Wainuiomata as in "close proximity" to a non-existent Wainuiomata Train Station.

== Background ==
Wainuiomata is in an isolated valley separated from Petone and Lower Hutt by the Eastern Hutt hills. In the 19th and early 20th centuries this isolation made communication difficult and a railway was desired to provide more efficient access to the outside world. As roads improved and car ownership rates rose during the 20th century, this function of a proposed railway declined, but at the same time the population of Wainuiomata increased and commuters to Wellington desired a railway line. However, the terrain is not favourable for a railway. A line into Wainuiomata would require either a steep route over the hills, resulting in a slow journey, or a lengthy and costly tunnel. This geography has been the main contributing factor to the rejection of all proposals so far.

== Proposals ==
=== 1870 proposal ===
The first proposal for a railway to Wainuiomata came as part of a route for the Wairarapa Line across the Rimutaka Range. Four routes were surveyed, including one through Wainuiomata. It was suggested by a Mr Sinclair, who farmed in the area and claimed he knew a route over the Rimutakas. The line surveyed by John Rochfort and his party ran from Kaitoke, at the northern end of the Hutt Valley, across the Eastern Hutt Hills into the valley of the Wainuiomata River, which it followed before crossing into the valley of the Ōrongorongo River. To leave the Ōrongorongo River and reach the Wairarapa, the line had to follow a tributary stream to a height of approximately 344.5 m (1130 feet), from which it faced a sudden and insurmountable drop to the Wairarapa. Accordingly, the proposal was given no further consideration. The circuitous nature of the route via Kaitoke meant an abbreviated form of this proposal was never subsequently considered for a line to Wainuiomata.

=== 1920s proposal ===
In order to enhance links between the Hutt Valley and the Wainuiomata Valley, then under development, and to cater for the needs of expected future residential development in the Wainuiomata Valley, a tunnel between the two valleys was proposed in 1928. On 2 July, an internal Railways Department memorandum noted of the proposal, made by the mayor of Lower Hutt in a recent meeting with the department:

That the Government set aside sufficient land now in its possession to permit of the construction of a railway line between Wainui Valley and the Government Railway System linking up at Woburn, Petone or elsewhere as is found upon investigation to be most desirable. The Wainui Development Limited to hand over to the Government free of charge the land necessary to continue this railway line from the boundary of the Government property to the northern boundary of the Wainui settlement (via the proposed tunnel) and to provide sufficient land, also free of charge for the laying out of the necessary tram stations, car sheds, and motor bus garages. The proposed railway to be constructed only when in the opinion of the Railway Department such a line is necessary.

Preliminary negotiations with affected land owners were commenced in September. An agreement was entered into between the department and the development company on 1 October, which set out the terms of the project and made the following points:

- The development company would construct a two-lane road tunnel, 55 chains in length, between Gracefield Road and the Wainuiomata Valley.
- The Railways Department would be granted the exclusive right to operate motor or electrical services through the tunnel.
- The development company would reserve sufficient land in the Wainuiomata Valley for terminal purposes for any services operated by the Railways Department through the tunnel.
- The company was to reserve a strip of land along the new main road through the company's subdivision for the possible future installation of an electrical tramway.
- The Railways Department would commence operating a bus service from the Wainuiomata Valley to Wellington, Lower Hutt and Petone via the tunnel once there was a permanent resident population in the Wainuiomata Valley of at least 50 families.
- The Railways Department would, when the amount of traffic was sufficient to justify it, construct at its own expense an electrical tramway from Gracefield Road to the Wainuiomata subdivision.

In early 1929 the Railways Department encountered difficulties in trying to arrange for the acquisition of some of the required land from Morley & Co. Mr C. Morley had purchased the land while visiting New Zealand in 1927, and with a specific purpose for the land in mind was unwilling to exchange with the land sought by the department or be compensated for it. On being notified by the department that it intended to indefinitely postpone negotiations for the purchase of the affected land, Morley thanked them by letter on 23 May 1929 for their candour and advised that he intended to proceed with his intentions for the land.

Though planning work for another facet of the project, the widening of Park Road, continued for several months, it appears that by the following year work on the project had ceased.

=== 1950s developments ===
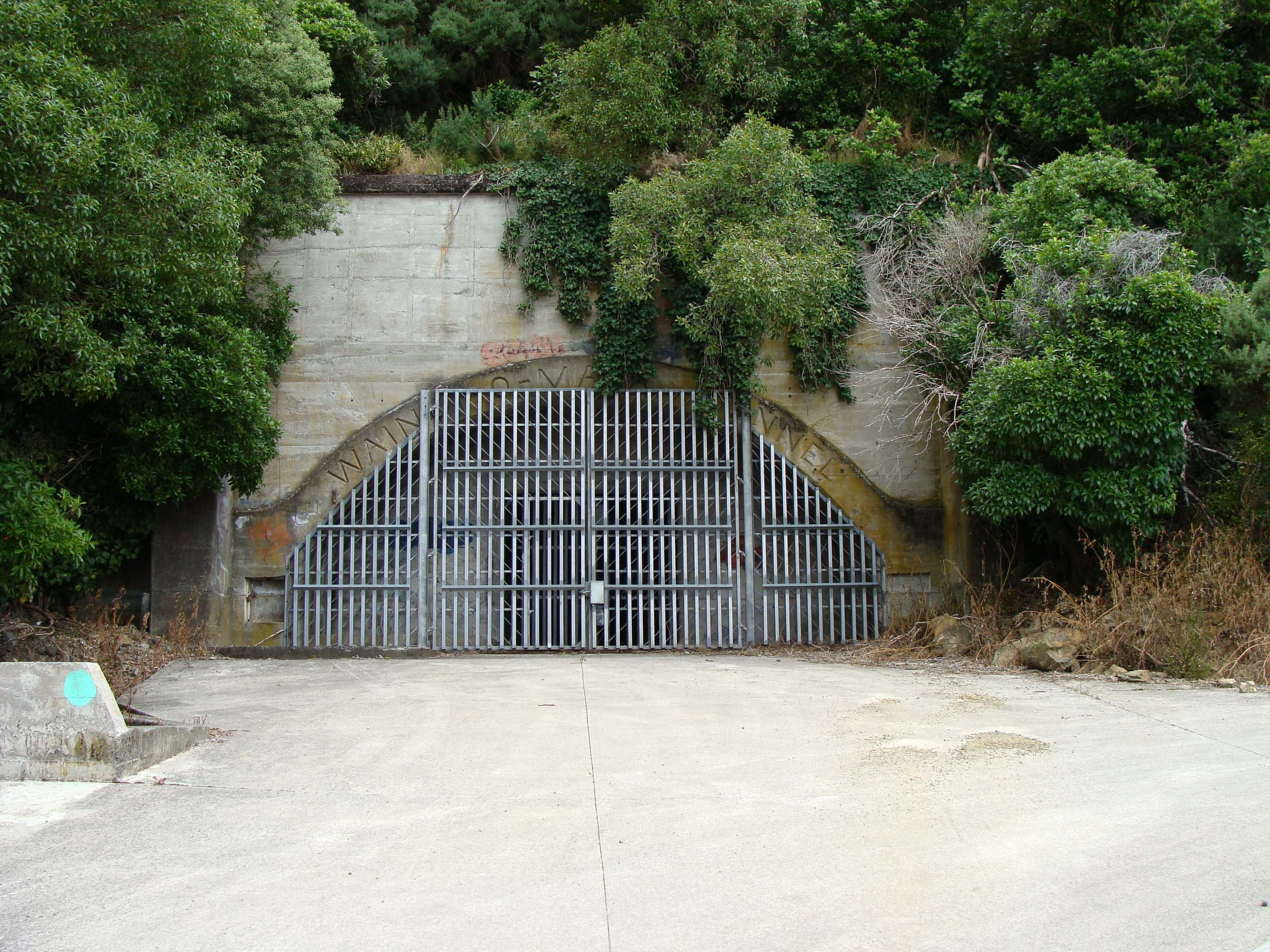
Wainuiomata road tunnel, which was expected to provide additional business for the Gracefield Branch. It never opened to road traffic.

A missive from the District Engineer's Office in 1952 concerning the industrial development at Seaview also covered the possible future transport needs of the Wainuiomata Valley, which at the time had not long been under development as a residential and industrial area.

The District Engineer made the point that the floor of the Wainuiomata Valley was some 300 ft higher than that of the Hutt Valley, and he thus considered that it would be improbable for Wainuiomata to ever have a rail link. However, he did consider that the expected completion of the road tunnel then under construction would make for much easier road access into Wainuiomata. As the Hutt Valley portal of the tunnel was near Gracefield Station (off the end of Tunnel Grove), it would be prudent to consider the possibility of the increased importance of the Hutt Valley Industrial Line to serve Wainuiomata.

To this end, he suggested various works and railways facilities that would be required to handle this traffic, including:

- Road overbridges for Park Road and Seaview Road, both of which were expected to become arterial thoroughfares.
- Relocation of the branch line to facilitate the construction of the Seaview Road overbridge.
- Installation of passenger platforms at Gracefield Station and related facilities.
- Provision of a marshalling yard, local sidings, goods shed, heavy crane, and other freight handling facilities for Gracefield Station.
- A straight shunting leg southward from the Gracefield Station yard with parallel track or tracks for passenger traffic.

=== 1963 report ===
Residential development of the Wainuiomata Valley had been happening only for about a decade when, in 1963, the New Zealand Geological Survey prepared a report for the Wellington City Council on options for a Wainuiomata rail link for consideration for a regional plan for Greater Wellington. There was no expectation at the time that road transport would be able to adequately serve the public transport needs of Wainuiomata, thus a rail link was considered to be a very real possibility.

Selecting a route was complicated by various considerations. The maximum permissible grade for a freight-carrying railway was about 1:40, which limited options for taking a line over the hills surrounding the valley. Such a line would have almost certainly required heavy earthworks and/or one or more short tunnels. The floor of the Wainuiomata Valley is some 350 ft higher than that of the Hutt Valley, so routes involving a tunnel through the hills were also limited. Both Woburn and Waterloo stations were rejected as possible junctions with a branch line, as they were considered to be too far from the hills.

The first route to be considered was a branch line from Epuni, climbing the side of the hills in the Hutt Valley, and passing through a tunnel near the present hill road before dropping into the Wainuiomata Valley. The ruling grade would have been about 1:60, and would possibly have required a second short tunnel to pass through a spur. Negative points for this option included the fact that it would have to pass through an appreciable amount of developed land, and a requirement for heavy earthworks.

The second and more favourable route would have started at Naenae, passed Taita Cemetery, around the head of Rata Street, through a spur by cutting or tunnel, then through the main tunnel at the head of Seddon Street. The ruling grade would have been about 1:45, but could have been reduced with more earthworks. Positive points for this option included the fact that it would have passed through less developed land, and would have had the secondary benefit of serving the industrial areas of Naenae and Taita.

=== 1975 report ===
On 4 August 1975, the Wainuiomata County Borough Council wrote to the Minister of Railways requesting that a feasibility study into a possible Waiuiomata – Hutt Valley rail link be conducted. Citing population growth in the Wainuiomata Valley and increasing traffic volumes, it proposed a line from the Hutt Industrial Branch (Gracefield Branch) to The Strand in Wainuiomata.

The line would be approximately 3 kilometres long, on a gradient of 1:40, and almost entirely in tunnel. It was expected that such a service would result in significant fuel savings by transferring passenger journeys that would have used road transport to rail, and would also reduce journey times for commuters between Wainuiomata and Wellington to no more than 30 minutes by avoiding traffic congestion.

Railways Department Projects Engineer R. S. Ryan produced a preliminary study on the proposal on 11 August which included estimates and more detail on issues such as expected patronage, service requirements, facilities, route, cost, and revenue. The report, using work done on the Auckland Rapid Transit project, assumed that six three-car electric multiple units, each with 300 passengers, would be required to meet peak-hour demand. In order to operate services at 15-minute intervals, some trains would consist of six cars, others three. Trains from Wainuiomata would run through to Wellington, connecting with Wairarapa trains at Ava and Petone.

Best Street and Bryan Heath Park were considered to be the most suitable sites for the terminus, being in the vicinity of several important routes through the valley, with the possibility of an extension to Moores Valley Road. A new station at Gracefield was recommended for access to the industrial and residential areas there.

The route would involve the completion of the "triangle" at the Woburn end of the Gracefield Branch to give direct access from Wellington to the branch line, avoiding the need to reverse from Woburn station. After crossing the Waiwhetū Stream and passing through Ministry of Works land between Hutt Park Road and Gracefield Road, the line would enter a tunnel at a grade of 1:40 and emerge at the terminus. This grade would need to be maintained for the entire distance between the Ministry of Works land and the terminus to ensure that the gradient did not exceed 1:40.

The report concluded that the project, while possible, would cost $30m to $35m (approximately $235m to $275m in 2008 prices), with operational and other costs of $760,000 per year and net revenue of $175,000 per year.

The Chief Civil Engineer responded to the Wainuiomata Council on 14 August refusing its request for a feasibility study, explaining that the department did not have sufficient resources, either financially or in personnel, to commit to the detailed study that would be required to determine the practicability of the proposal. Citing information from the preliminary report, he pointed out that at current fare levels such a service would run at a considerable loss, and he did not expect that it could be budgeted for within the next 10 years.

Following the rebuff from the Railways Department, the Council resolved at a meeting on 8 September to approach the Public Works Department with the same request for a feasibility study. Despite these efforts, no further work was undertaken on the proposal.
