= Frank Brugger =

New Zealand businessman (1927–2000)

Franz Brugger OBE
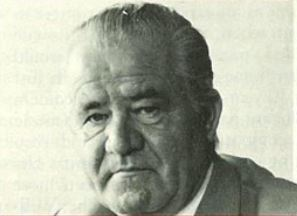
- Frank Brugger in 1985
- Born: 7 March 1927; Rottenmann, Austria
- Died: 27 February 2000 (aged 72); Wainuiomata, New Zealand
- Occupations: Businessman, industrial manager
- Known for: Founder of Brugger Industries; automotive components manufacturing and wood-burning stove production in New Zealand
- Awards: Order of the British Empire (OBE)

Franz "Frank" Brugger, OBE (7 March 1927 — 27 February 2000) was a New Zealand businessman known for his car parts factory in Wainuiomata and production of a highly efficient wood burning stove. He was born in Rottenmann, Austria, on 7 March 1927 and died in Wainuiomata, New Zealand on 27 February 2000.

Brugger obtained a degree in industrial management at Rottemann University, then emigrated from Austria to New Zealand in 1956. After working for Mobil, he set up his own welding business in Petone in 1959. Noting that car assembly plants were required to increase the amount of locally manufactured components, he took the opportunity and built a factory in Wainuiomata in 1970. Wainuiomata at the time was growing rapidly and a number of Brugger's staff already lived there. Brugger Industries made many components for cars, including car seats, panels, floor coverings, head linings and sun-visors.

Further operations were set up in Auckland, Dunedin and Levin and Brugger also set up an engineering business in Samoa, where he had the honorary title of Toleafoa. Brugger represented New Zealand on trade delegations to Switzerland, Germany and Japan. By 1983 the company employed 600 staff and had an annual turnover of $20 million.

In the early 1970s, George Katzer at the DSIR Physics and Engineering Laboratory in Lower Hutt designed a new type of wood-burning stove, and the DSIR opted to make the design freely available rather than patent it. The unique design, though more expensive to produce than other stoves, had several advantages: extremely high efficiency, burning one load of wood for seven hours with only a small amount of ash residue; little smoke; and no soot or creosote in the chimney. The stove-top could be used for cooking, and a loop pipe to heat water could be incorporated into the stove. Brugger Industries approached the DSIR about producing the stove, and the 'BI [Brugger Industries] wood-burning stove' began production in Wainuiomata in 1978. It was also known as the 'Ugly Duckling wood stove' or the 'Pyroclassic'.

In 1985, Brugger received an Air New Zealand Enterprise Award. He received an OBE in 1986 for services to industry, export and the community. Brugger retired in 1986 and died in 2000.
