= Wainuiomata Tunnel =

Planned tunnel in New Zealand

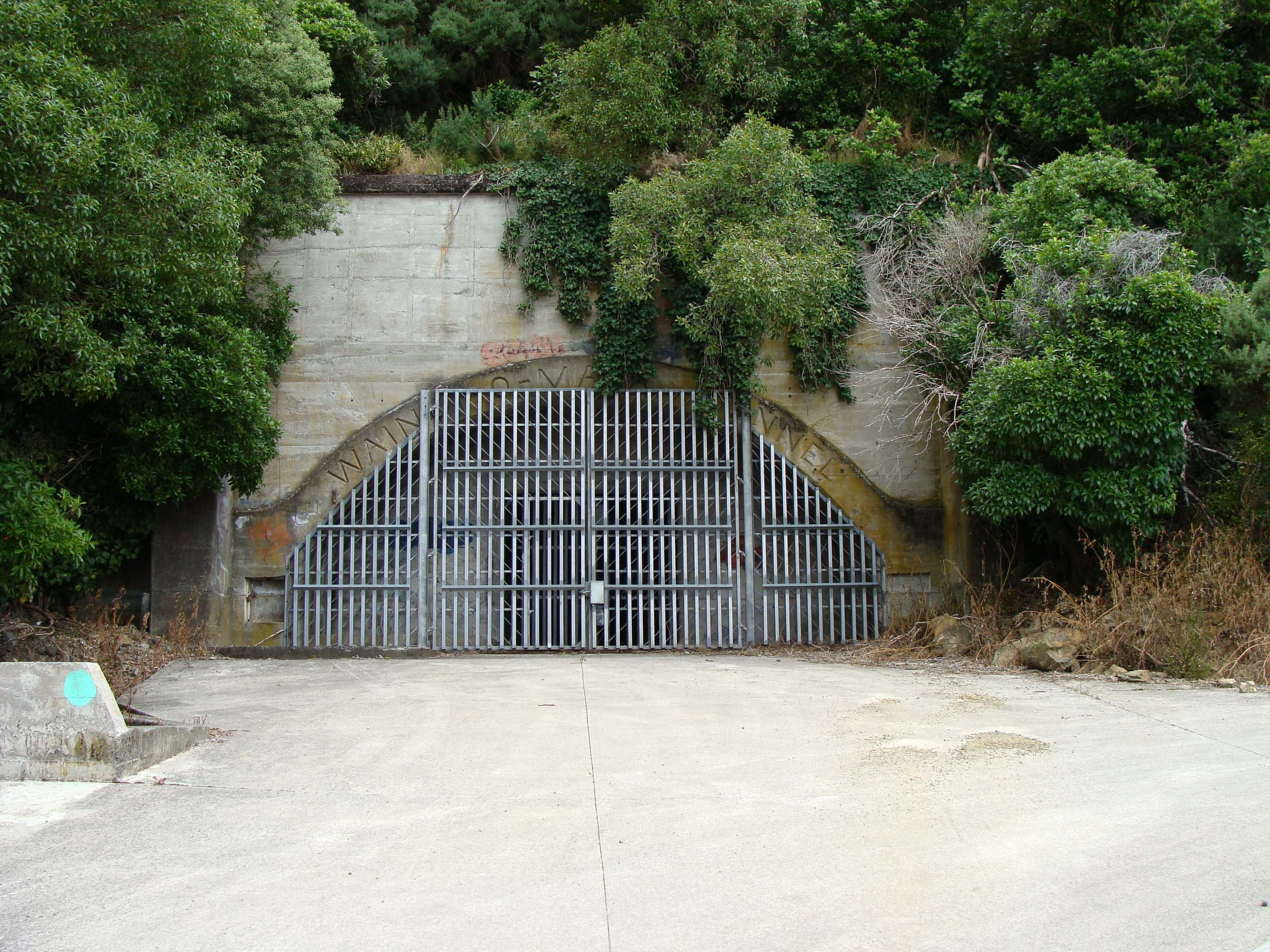
- Hutt Valley portal of the Wainuiomata Tunnel

Overview
- Location: Lower Hutt, Wellington, New Zealand
- Coordinates: West (Lower Hutt) portal: 41.24314°S 174.91824°E; East (Wainuiomata) portal: 41.24855°S 174.92592°E
- Status: abandoned as road tunnel, converted to utility tunnel
- Start: Tunnel Grove, Gracefield, Lower Hutt
- End: Waiu Street, Wainuiomata, Lower Hutt

Operation
- Work began: 25 January 1932
- Owner: Greater Wellington Regional Council
- Traffic: pedestrian/cyclist and automotive (planned)
- Character: road (planned); utility (current)

Technical
- No. of lanes: 2 (planned)
- Max elevation: 100 metres (328 ft)
- Min elevation: 34 metres (112 ft)
- Tunnel clearance: 16 feet (4.9 m)
- Width: 25 feet 6 inches (7.77 m)
- Grade: 1 in 15

The Wainuiomata Tunnel was planned to improve access to the Wainuiomata Valley in the Wellington region of New Zealand’s North Island as part of a scheme to commence residential development there in the 1930s. Construction started in 1932 but was halted a couple of years later when only partly completed due to a lack of funds brought about by economic depression.

The tunnel was never opened to road traffic, and other than a brief stint of military service during World War II, remained unused until sold in 1975. Thereafter it was completed as a utility tunnel, initially carrying only a water pipe, but later other services were added.

== History ==
=== Background ===
Wainui-o-Mata Development Limited was formed for the purpose of developing the Wainuiomata Valley through the acquisition of land, subdivision, and sale of residential lots. An important part of the project was the construction of a tunnel linking the Hutt Valley and Wainuiomata Valley to improve access to the new settlement.

=== Planning ===
Like the then recently completed Mount Victoria Tunnel in Wellington, the Wainuiomata Tunnel was designed to allow for two lanes of opposing general vehicular traffic with a raised pedestrian pathway on the north side. Starting from a point near the industrial park at Gracefield, it would rise on a gradient of 1 in 15 to emerge at the foot of the hills in Wainuiomata near the existing hill road. It was to be 26 feet 6 inches (8.08 m) wide, 18 feet (5.5 m) high, and have a length of 49 chains (3,200 ft; 990 m). The footpath would be 4 feet (1.2 m) wide, 3 feet (0.91 m) above the floor of the tunnel.

The Railways Department became particularly interested in the tunnel and realised it would be advantageous for them to obtain the right to access the tunnel before their competitors were able to establish competing services. To this end, they entered into an agreement on 1 October 1928 with Wainuiomata Development for the sole right to operate “motor or electrical passenger transportation” through the tunnel between Wainuiomata and Wellington City, Lower Hutt, or Petone. The agreement also committed the parties to the following:

- The Company would ensure that the tunnel was sufficiently wide enough to enable two motorbuses to pass each other.
- The Company would make available to the Department suitable land for terminal facilities in the Wainuiomata Valley.
- The Company would reserve a 20-foot (6.1 m) wide strip of land down the centre of the main road through the new settlement.
- The Department would commence operation of a motor transportation service between Wainuiomata and Wellington City, Lower Hutt, and Petone once the Valley sustained a permanent population of at least 50 families.
- The Department reserved the right to establish and operate an electrical tramway from Gracefield Road, through the tunnel, and down the centre reservation on the main road at its discretion to supplement the motorbus service.

Wainuiomata Development called for tenders to construct the tunnel in October 1931 and awarded a contract for the same to Templeton Tunnel Construction Company.

=== Construction ===
Wainuiomata Tunnel under construction

Work commenced on 25 January 1932 using subsidised labour from a work relief scheme to find employment for those affected by the economic depression. A workers camp was erected; flat land was cleared around the portal on which buildings were erected for the workshop and powerhouse. Plant included an electric motor for running air compressors, ventilation, and the equipment used to apply the concrete lining to the completed tunnel walls. Formwork for the tunnel portal was assembled and the hillside prepared for the building of the portal. Additional men were due to start work at the site after 1 February.

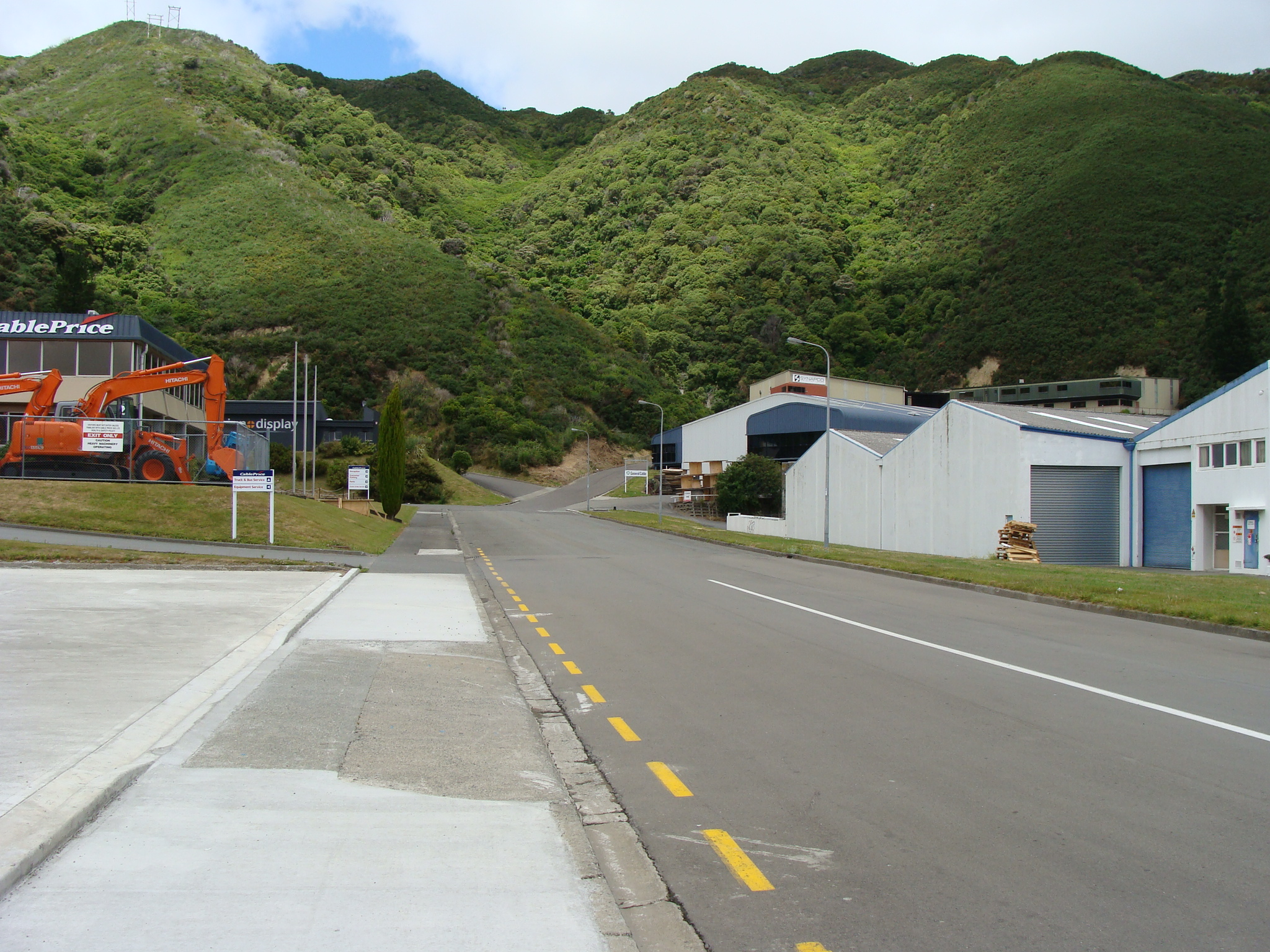
Tunnel Grove, the access road to the Hutt Valley portal

Unlike the standard practice for tunnel construction in which at least two faces are advanced simultaneously (either end of the tunnel), it was decided in the case of the Wainuiomata Tunnel that work would only take place from the western end towards Wainuiomata. This was done for drainage; on such a steep grade it was easier to work uphill and let the water that flowed into the tunnel drain out naturally rather than have to pump it out (as would be the case if they had worked downhill from the Wainuiomata end). It was noted, however, that if needed up to three 8-hour shifts per day could be deployed at both ends of the tunnel to improve progress. The men working in the tunnel found that the ground they were excavating was not ideal for tunnelling, and often encountered soft earth or “rotten” rock.

The first pass on the tunnel shaft was not to excavate down to the full depth of the completed tunnel. Rather, an additional 3 feet (0.91 m) of earth was to be removed before the sealed roadway could be laid through the tunnel.

Various reports from the early 1930s noted steady progress. However, as the financing of works related to the Wainuiomata development relied in part on the sale of land in the valley, the effect of economic depression at the time was to deny the Company revenue from this source as real estate activity slowed, depriving it of the funds it needed to continue the development. Consequently, the Company temporarily suspended all work on the tunnel in April 1934 as it sought alternative finance to restart the project. These efforts were to no avail, and it was noted in 1936 that the Company had “ceased practically all activity” at the tunnel construction site having completed 17 chains (1,100 ft; 340 m) (roughly one third) of its total length, with about 15 chains (990 ft; 300 m) of that lined.

During the 1935 general election campaign in November of that year, the Labour candidate for the Hutt electorate, Walter Nash, criticised his opponent for supporting the expenditure of unemployment subsidies on the improvement of access to Wainuiomata including work on both the widening of the hill road and the driving of the tunnel through the hill.

=== World War II ===
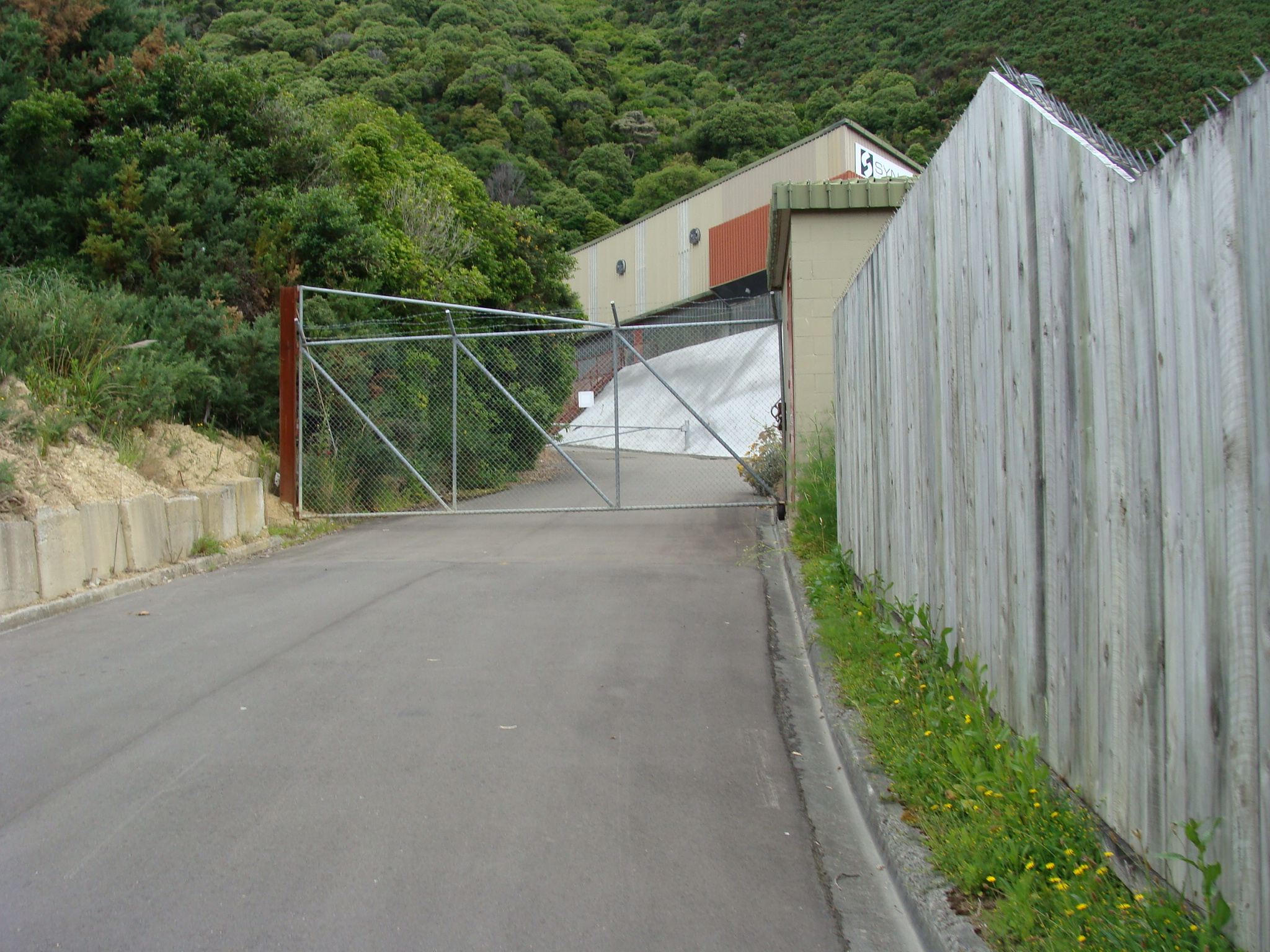
Access to the Hutt Valley portal is restricted

The Quartermaster-General approached the Wainuiomata Development Company in 1942 on behalf of the New Zealand Army to lease the tunnel. Their intention was to use the tunnel primarily for the storage of explosives but potentially also as an air raid shelter. They sought a term covering the duration of the war plus six months, to which the Company was agreeable, on the proviso that the Company be able to terminate the agreement with six months notice if they decided to resume work on the tunnel and it was not required for “essential war purposes”. The lease covered the land and buildings at the tunnel, at a rate of £156 per annum, commencing on 2 April 1942.

Having obtained the Company’s permission, the Army authorised modifications to be made at the tunnel for the preparation of the magazine on 8 April 1942. Work included installation of electric lighting, an upgrade of the drainage, erection of a security fence enclosing the entire tunnel section with a gate allowing truck access, levelling inside the tunnel to make it suitable for stacking the explosives, and the building of a loading dock to facilitate the transfer of goods to and from the trucks. The Public Works Department handed over the completed magazine to the Army on 8 June 1942.

Early termination of the lease was requested when the Quartermaster-General advised the Company that the Army intended to vacate the site effective 15 September 1944. This date was missed, and it was not until 26 February 1945 that possession was relinquished, once all stores had been removed and restoration works completed.

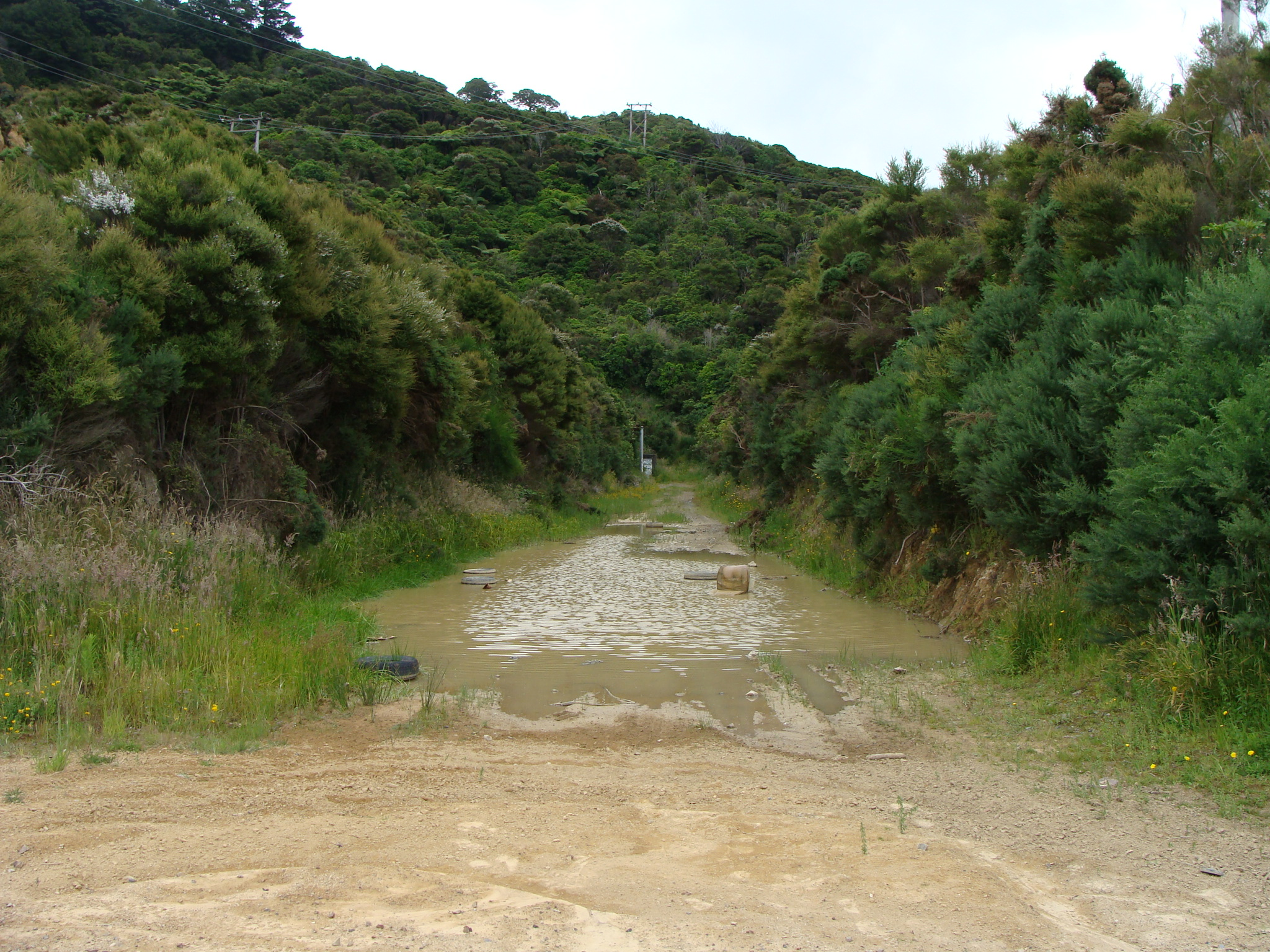
Cutting and approach to what was to have been the Wainuiomata portal. The concrete structure at the far end is the top of the stairwell that facilitates pedestrian access into the Wainuiomata end of the tunnel.

=== Advocacy for completion ===
After the suspension of construction on the tunnel in the 1930s, there was optimism through to the 1950s that it would be restarted at some point, particularly after residential development commenced at Wainuiomata in 1941.

A conference was held around 1956 at which the Public Works Department, the Hutt City Council, and the development company were represented to consider the future of the tunnel. It was agreed that the tunnel, in its present form, was unsuitable for use either by road or rail traffic. The amount of space allowed for the roadway was not wide enough for the requirements of contemporary road traffic. It was estimated that the tunnel could be completed to suit requirements for around £600,000 (in 1966), which would likely involve the removal of the existing lining so the size of the bore could be increased.

During the 1963 general election campaign, the Labour candidate for Petone, Michael Moohan, stated that the issue of the Wainuiomata Tunnel was a “dead duck”. In response to a question from a constituent, he noted that the tunnel was not wide enough for modern traffic requirements and was too steep to be turned into a rail tunnel.

=== Repurposed for water reticulation ===
By the 1970s, replacement of the water supply pipe that was running through the Waiwhetu Tunnel had become necessary. The Wellington Regional Water Board purchased Wainuiomata Tunnel from Wainuiomata Development Company in 1975, intending to use it for a much larger, replacement water pipe. Even after this acquisition there was opposition to the proposal to lay a water main through the tunnel, as such action would preclude its completion as a road tunnel at some point in the future.

A contract for the completion of the tunnel was let to Codelfa Construction NZ Limited. They started work early in 1980, reaching Wainuiomata in September of that year. The section of tunnel excavated at this time was completed to a smaller width of 2.4 metres (7 ft 10 in).

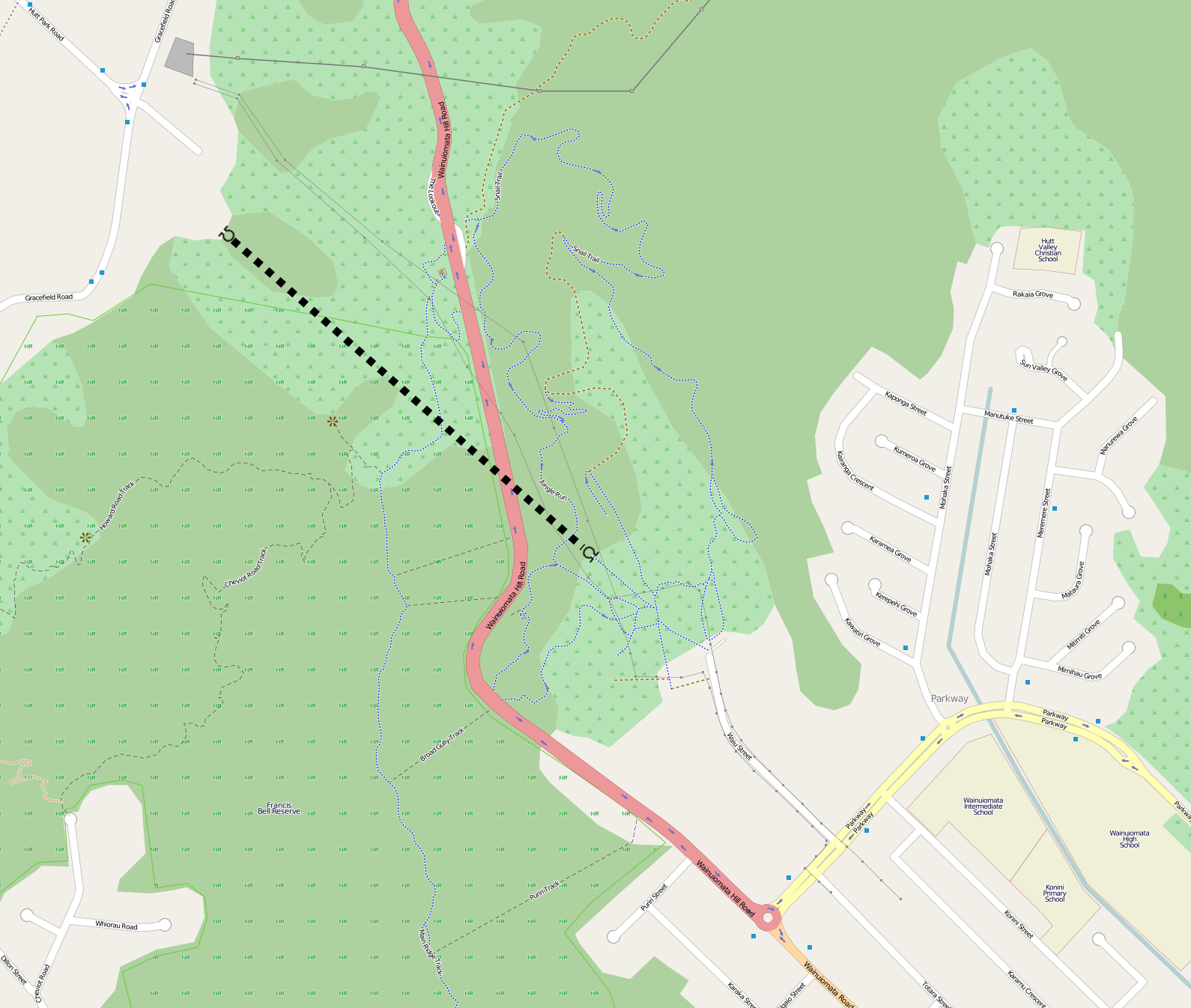
Location of the tunnel

== Alternatives ==
After the tunnel was abandoned as a means of providing road access to Wainuiomata, other routes gained prominence. Wainuiomata Road was upgraded and presently is the main access route at the southern end of the valley.

Another idea that gained popularity, especially as a way to provide a second road access route and an alternative to the hill road, is a link between Wainuiomata and the suburb of Naenae in the Hutt Valley. The most likely option would be a road connecting Upper Fitzherbert Road, Wainuiomata, via a tunnel, to Seddon Street in Naenae.

== Today ==
Greater Wellington Regional Council is responsible for the tunnel, and also maintains the water supply pipe that runs through it. The tunnel also now carries a sewer pipeline and telecommunications cables.

When the Hutt City Council wanted to construct a new wastewater treatment plant at Seaview in the 1990s, they attempted to secure access to the Wainuiomata Tunnel to build the sewer pipeline to connect the new plant to Wainuiomata. As this wasn’t an option at the time, they were offered, and accepted, the alternative of the nearby smaller, and much older, Waiwhetu Tunnel that had previously been used for a water supply pipe. In 2001, negotiations between the Regional Council and Hutt City Council resulted in an agreement for the latter to be able to use the Wainuiomata Tunnel and some associated land for which an easement was granted for the installation of their sewer pipe.

The tunnel is occasionally opened to the public for organised tours.

== See also ==
- Wainuiomata railway proposals
