= Wainuiomata =

Suburb in Lower Hutt, New Zealand

- A view of Wainuiomata as seen from above Sunny Grove looking North.
- Nickname: Nappy Valley (historic)
- Interactive map of Wainuiomata
- Coordinates: 41°15′41″S 174°57′3″E
- Country: New Zealand
- Region: Wellington
- Territorial authority: Lower Hutt City
- Ward: Wainuiomata
- Community board: Wainuiomata Community Board
- Electorates: Hutt South; Ikaroa-Rāwhiti (Māori)

Government
  - Territorial Authority: Hutt City Council
  - Regional council: Greater Wellington Regional Council
  - Mayor of Lower Hutt: Ken Laban
  - Hutt South MP: Ginny Andersen
  - Ikaroa-Rāwhiti MP: Cushla Tangaere-Manuel

Area
  - Total: 17.79 km^{2} (6.87 sq mi)
- Elevation: 86 m (282 ft)

Population (June 2025)
  - Total: 20,450
  - Density: 1,150/km^{2} (2,977/sq mi)
- Postcode: 5014
- Website: www.wainuiomata.co.nz

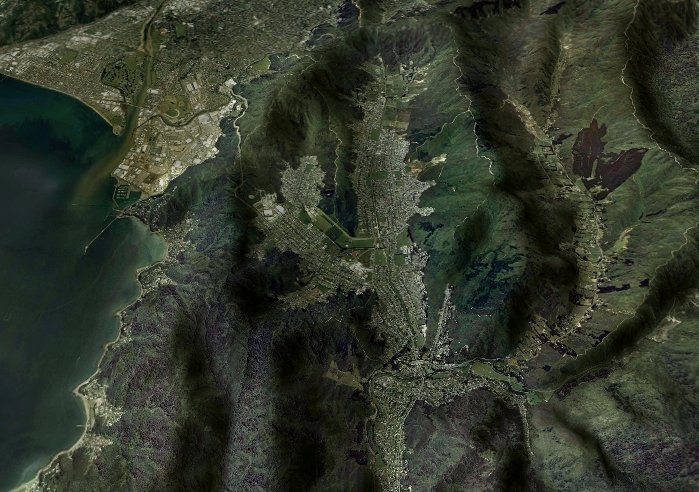
An aerial view of the Wainuiomata Valley. The Hutt Valley and Wellington Harbour appear on the left, with Moores Valley to the right.

Wainuiomata (/ˌwaɪnuːiˈɔːmɑːtə/) is a large dormitory suburb of Lower Hutt, in the Wellington metropolitan area in New Zealand. Its population was estimated as being 20,450 as of June 2025, with a density of 1,600 people per km^{2}. European settlement of Wainuiomata began in the 1850s with timber-felling and farming and began to grow in the 1920s. After World War 2 there was rapid population expansion, with Wainuiomata earning the nickname 'Nappy Valley' because of the large number of families with young children. From the late 1980s the economy slowed and the population decreased, but since about 2020 there has been a housing boom and corresponding increase in population. Wainuiomata is noted for being the origin of New Zealand's kōhanga reo (Māori-language immersion preschool) movement.

== Origin of name ==
The word 'Wainui-o-mata' is a Māori name made up of the words Wai = water, Nui = big, O = of, and Mata – which could refer to a woman's name. The origins of the word are disputed, but one commonly accepted translation refers to the women who came over the Wainuiomata Hill to evade marauding tribes from the north, and who sat wailing by the stream after the slaughter of their menfolk. From this we have 'faces streaming with water' or 'tears' although it could equally refer to the large pools of water which lay over the swampy surface (face) of the northern end of the Valley, or the river itself which is known to flood the Wainui (Coast Road) valley.

The town is often abbreviated to Wainui by locals.

== History ==
Wainuiomata occupies a basin at the headwaters of the Wainuiomata River, between the eastern Hutt hills and the Ōrongorongo Range. There are conflicting reports about the evidence of Māori occupation of the basin prior to European settlement. One source says there is evidence Māori were in Wainuiomata from the moa-hunting period and the iwi Rangitāne, Ngāti Ira and Kahungunu were all settled there. The earliest European settlements grew up around the river, where timber mills supplied the Wellington region when the demand was great in the 1850s and '60s. Today this area is known as "The Village" or "Homedale". In the 1850s Sir William Fitzherbert started a flax-milling business in the north of the valley, but this proved economically unviable. The isolated location of Wainuiomata proved a problem for early settlers. Narrow hill routes into the settlement were the only access during the 1850s and 1860s. By the end of the 19th century there were two roads in the valley: Main Road and Fitzherbert Road (known locally as "Swamp Road").

In 1866 the Methodist Wainuiomata Coast Road Church was built on land donated by settler Richard Prouse. The oldest Methodist church and the third-oldest church in the Wellington region, it was used for regular services until the congregation outgrew it and moved to the new St Stephens Church in 1958.

With the clearing of the forests, sheep- and dairy-farming became an important part of the local economy. The settlement started to grow in the 1920s.

In 1928 Wainui-o-Mata Development Limited formed for the purpose of developing the Wainuiomata Valley through the acquisition of 1,600 hectares (4,000 acres) of land, its subdivision and its sale as residential lots. An important part of the project involved the construction of the Wainuiomata Tunnel which would link the Hutt Valley and Wainuiomata Valley and improve access to the new settlement. Construction of the tunnel commenced in 1932, but the Depression brought a halt to construction, with many investors in the company losing money. The tunnel was never completed.

After World War II ended in 1945, major growth occurred due to affordable housing developments attracting many young couples, which transformed Wainuiomata into a working-class community. This influx of young families earned the community the nickname of "Nappy Valley" in the 1950s. In 1965, the local member of Parliament urged construction of more schools, noting that there were 2500-3000 children under school age in Wainuiomata and 500 or 600 more were being born each year. The large population of children saw many schools built: Glendale School (1958), Fernlea School (1963), Wainuiomata College (1963), Wood Hatton School (1964), Arakura School (1965), Pencarrow School (1966), Wainuiomata Intermediate (1968), Parkway School (1969), Parkway Intermediate (1970), Parkway College (1972), Sun Valley School (1978). Some of these schools closed in the 2000s as the population had aged and decreased.

New Zealand's first kōhanga reo opened in Wainuiomata in 1982.

Gary McCormick's 1994 documentary series Heartland featured an episode about Wainuiomata. The programme angered many local people because it focussed on negative aspects and ignored many positive things going on in the valley. One resident featured on the programme was Chloe Reeves, who for a time became known as 'Chloe of Wainuiomata'.

In April 2009 a Palmerston North hotelier banned all Wainuiomata residents after a series of misdemeanours by visitors from there.

The first series of the television production Seven Periods with Mr Gormsby was shot in the old Wainuiomata College with many local residents as cast members.

In 2022, a study commissioned by Wellington Regional Council and conducted by Jim Lynch, the founder of Zealandia, found that establishing a wildlife sanctuary in the Wainuiomata Water Collection Area was "technically and practically feasible". The name given to the proposed sanctuary is Puketahā.

== Geography ==
Wainuiomata is situated in a basin surrounded by hills. The topography reduces local wind-flow, resulting in lower minimum temperatures in winter and higher maximum temperatures in summer than in most other parts of Wellington and the Hutt Valley. The valley floor is 86 m above sea level, and the highest point of the Wainuiomata Hill Road is 195 m above sea level.

Wainuiomata River flows through the southern part of Wainuiomata, draining to the sea at Baring Head to the south. Two major tributaries join Wainuiomata River in the Homedale area: Wainuiomata Stream from Moore's Valley, and Black Creek, from north Wainuiomata. Water is piped from Wainuiomata to supply Wellington City with fresh water.

The Ōrongorongo Valley, accessed via the Wainuiomata Valley, features bush walks and native-forest scenery.

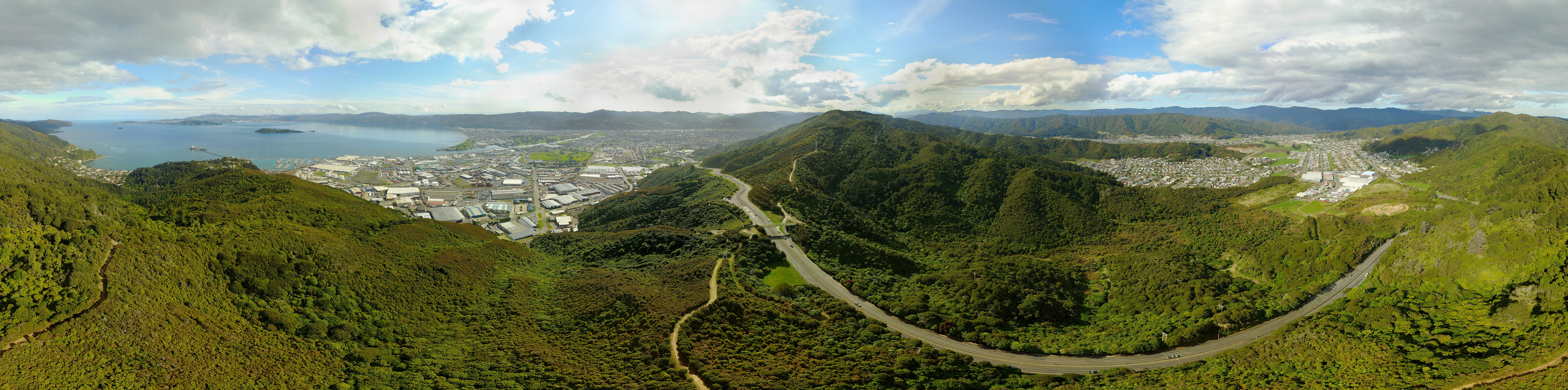
A 360 degree panorama taken 400 feet above the Wanuiomata hills. Wellington Harbour can be seen on the far left, with Petone and the Hutt Valley towards the middle of the image. The Wainuiomata Hill road can be seen curling around the bottom right of the image as it snakes into the suburb of Wainuiomata on the right hand side.

== Climate ==
Climate data for Wainuiomata (1981–2010 normals, extremes 1970–1994)
Month	Jan	Feb	Mar	Apr	May	Jun	Jul	Aug	Sep	Oct	Nov	Dec	Year
Record high °C (°F)	30.1 (86.2)	30 (86)	28.9 (84.0)	25.2 (77.4)	22.4 (72.3)	19.7 (67.5)	16.1 (61.0)	18 (64)	21.1 (70.0)	21.8 (71.2)	26.1 (79.0)	28 (82)	30.1 (86.2)
Mean daily maximum °C (°F)	21.0 (69.8)	21.3 (70.3)	19.6 (67.3)	17.0 (62.6)	14.7 (58.5)	12.5 (54.5)	11.7 (53.1)	12.4 (54.3)	14.1 (57.4)	15.3 (59.5)	17.1 (62.8)	19.1 (66.4)	16.3 (61.4)
Daily mean °C (°F)	16.8 (62.2)	16.8 (62.2)	15.4 (59.7)	12.9 (55.2)	10.8 (51.4)	9.1 (48.4)	8.0 (46.4)	8.7 (47.7)	10.4 (50.7)	11.6 (52.9)	13.2 (55.8)	15.3 (59.5)	12.4 (54.3)
Mean daily minimum °C (°F)	12.5 (54.5)	12.4 (54.3)	11.1 (52.0)	8.7 (47.7)	7.0 (44.6)	5.6 (42.1)	4.4 (39.9)	4.9 (40.8)	6.7 (44.1)	7.9 (46.2)	9.4 (48.9)	11.6 (52.9)	8.5 (47.3)
Record low °C (°F)	2.6 (36.7)	2.5 (36.5)	1.4 (34.5)	0.2 (32.4)	−3.5 (25.7)	−3.2 (26.2)	−4.5 (23.9)	−3 (27)	−1.3 (29.7)	−0.6 (30.9)	0.3 (32.5)	2 (36)	−4.5 (23.9)
Average rainfall mm (inches)	69.4 (2.73)	72.5 (2.85)	132.7 (5.22)	106.4 (4.19)	172.1 (6.78)	186.9 (7.36)	184.6 (7.27)	140.6 (5.54)	131.0 (5.16)	139.5 (5.49)	128.1 (5.04)	105.4 (4.15)	1,569.2 (61.78)
Source: NIWA

== Demographics ==
=== Wainuiomata Central ===
Wainuiomata Central statistical area covers 1.26 km^{2} (0.49 sq mi). It had an estimated population of 2,200 as of June 2025, with a population density of 1,746 people per km^{2}.

Historical population for Wainuiomata Central
Year	Pop.	±% p.a.
2006	1,635	—
2013	1,680	+0.39%
2018	1,803	+1.42%
2023	1,920	+1.27%

Wainuiomata Central had a population of 1,920 in the 2023 New Zealand census, an increase of 117 people (6.5%) since the 2018 census, and an increase of 240 people (14.3%) since the 2013 census. There were 909 males, 1,002 females, and 9 people of other genders in 687 dwellings. 3.8% of people identified as LGBTIQ+. The median age was 37.3 years (compared with 38.1 years nationally). There were 384 people (20.0%) aged under 15 years, 360 (18.8%) aged 15 to 29, 852 (44.4%) aged 30 to 64, and 327 (17.0%) aged 65 or older.

People could identify as more than one ethnicity. The results were 63.9% European (Pākehā); 27.7% Māori; 15.3% Pasifika; 15.3% Asian; 0.9% Middle Eastern, Latin American and African New Zealanders (MELAA); and 1.6% other, which includes people giving their ethnicity as "New Zealander". English was spoken by 96.2%, Māori by 8.9%, Samoan by 5.2%, and other languages by 13.8%. No language could be spoken by 2.0% (e.g. too young to talk). New Zealand Sign Language was known by 0.3%. The percentage of people born overseas was 24.2, compared with 28.8% nationally.

Religious affiliations were 37.3% Christian, 5.3% Hindu, 0.6% Islam, 1.6% Māori religious beliefs, 0.6% Buddhist, 0.6% New Age, and 2.3% other religions. People who answered that they had no religion were 44.5%, and 7.2% of people did not answer the census question.

Of those at least 15 years old, 246 (16.0%) people had a bachelor's or higher degree, 852 (55.5%) had a post-high school certificate or diploma, and 438 (28.5%) people exclusively held high school qualifications. The median income was $41,900, compared with $41,500 nationally. 123 people (8.0%) earned over $100,000 compared to 12.1% nationally. The employment status of those at least 15 was 834 (54.3%) full-time, 165 (10.7%) part-time, and 54 (3.5%) unemployed.

=== Greater Wainuiomata ===
The full suburb of Wainuiomata, comprising the statistical areas of Arakura, Wainuiomata West, Glendale, Wainuiomata Central, Homedale East, Homedale West, and Towai, covers 17.79 km^{2} (6.87 sq mi). It had an estimated population of 20,450 as of June 2025, with a population density of 1,150 people per km^{2}.

Historical population for Greater Wainuiomata
Year	Pop.	±% p.a.
2006	16,644	—
2013	16,710	+0.06%
2018	17,907	+1.39%
2023	18,912	+1.10%

Wainuiomata had a population of 18,912 in the 2023 New Zealand census, an increase of 1,005 people (5.6%) since the 2018 census, and an increase of 2,202 people (13.2%) since the 2013 census. There were 9,405 males, 9,447 females, and 63 people of other genders in 6,381 dwellings. 3.3% of people identified as LGBTIQ+. The median age was 34.4 years (compared with 38.1 years nationally). There were 4,107 people (21.7%) aged under 15 years, 3,795 (20.1%) aged 15 to 29, 8,901 (47.1%) aged 30 to 64, and 2,109 (11.2%) aged 65 or older.

People could identify as more than one ethnicity. The results were 62.4% European (Pākehā); 30.7% Māori; 16.3% Pasifika; 14.8% Asian; 1.1% Middle Eastern, Latin American and African New Zealanders (MELAA); and 1.8% other, which includes people giving their ethnicity as "New Zealander". English was spoken by 95.7%, Māori by 8.5%, Samoan by 5.4%, and other languages by 12.1%. No language could be spoken by 2.6% (e.g. too young to talk). New Zealand Sign Language was known by 0.6%. The percentage of people born overseas was 21.7, compared with 28.8% nationally.

Religious affiliations were 33.6% Christian, 4.0% Hindu, 0.8% Islam, 1.6% Māori religious beliefs, 0.8% Buddhist, 0.5% New Age, and 2.1% other religions. People who answered that they had no religion were 50.1%, and 6.6% of people did not answer the census question.

Of those at least 15 years old, 2,538 (17.1%) people had a bachelor's or higher degree, 8,385 (56.6%) had a post-high school certificate or diploma, and 3,882 (26.2%) people exclusively held high school qualifications. The median income was $47,200, compared with $41,500 nationally. 1,278 people (8.6%) earned over $100,000 compared to 12.1% nationally. The employment status of those at least 15 was 8,613 (58.2%) full-time, 1,569 (10.6%) part-time, and 528 (3.6%) unemployed.

Individual statistical areas
Name	Area (km^{2})	Population	Density (per km^{2})	Dwellings	Median age	Median income
Towai	5.02	0	0	0	—	$0
Arakura	1.98	2,844	1,451	960	33.3 years	$45,600
Wainuiomata West	2.11	3,849	1,824	1,311	34.7 years	$49,900
Glendale	3.21	4,452	488	1,407	33.2 years	$48,800
Wainuiomata Central	1.26	1,920	1,524	687	37.3 years	$41,900
Homedale East	2.93	3,126	1,067	1,068	35.2 years	$47,500
Homedale West	1.31	2,721	2.077	945	34.6 years	$46,100
New Zealand					38.1 years	$41,500

== Government ==
Since the 1989 New Zealand local government reforms, Wainuiomata (together with Petone, Eastbourne and Lower Hutt) has been governed by Hutt City Council. The Wainuiomata ward covers the suburb and the surrounding rural area, electing one councillor to the Hutt City Council. Since the 2019 local elections, the ward has been represented by Keri Brown.

At the national level, Wainuiomata falls in the Hutt South general electorate and the Ikaroa-Rāwhiti Māori electorate. Since 2023, Lower Hutt resident and National Party MP Chris Bishop represents Hutt South.

== Economy ==
Wainuiomata has traditionally been a dormitory suburb: most residents work outside the valley. Several factories that operated in Wainuiomata during the second half of the twentieth century closed down in the late 1980s and 1990s after changes in government regulation of imported goods. Wainuiomata entered a long period of economic stagnation and population decline, but since around 2020 the suburb has seen new development, including a revamped town centre, a new retirement village and a building boom as new areas are opened up for housing and older bungalows are demolished to make way for medium density townhouses.

=== Wainuiomata Mall ===
Wainuiomata Mall was established in 1970. After struggling for several years the mall was demolished in 2020, to be made into a smaller shopping centre with a new Countdown supermarket.

=== Brugger Industries ===
Frank Brugger began business in Petone and his company Brugger Industries established a factory in Wainuiomata in 1970, employing hundreds of local people. The company made car seats and other components for the domestic car assembly industry, and also manufactured a highly-efficient pyroclastic stove. Brugger retired in 1986 and the factory changed ownership, before closing in 1998.

=== Bata Shoe Company ===
Bata opened a factory in Wainuiomata in 1967, producing gumboots, sandals and Bata bullets (a popular canvas sneaker). The company faced challenges in the 1980s after the government changed its regulation of imported footwear, and the Wainuiomata factory closed in 1992.

=== Tatra Leather Goods ===
Tatra, founded by Frederick Turnovsky, produced leather accessories such as belts and wallets at a factory in Wainuiomata which operated between the 1960s and 1980s. By 1976, the factory had 200 workers and was said to be the largest employer in Wainuiomata. Tatra went into receivership in 1988, after a downturn in business due to competition from cheap imported leather goods.

=== Feltex Carpets ===
Feltex opened a textile mill in Wainuiomata in 1974. The factory was bought by Alliance Textiles in December 1996 and closed shortly after, with the loss of about 70 jobs. The building later housed a church, and in 2013 Big Save Furniture set up a distribution centre in the former factory.

=== Tom & Luke ===
Tom & Luke is a snack food manufacturer based in Wainuiomata that sells its products in New Zealand and exports to Australia, Asia and the United States. It was founded by Tom Dorman and Luke Cooper in 2013. The company employs around 45 people, mostly locals. In 2022 Tom & Luke won the Wellington School of Business and Government Judge's Choice Award at the ExportNZ ASB Wellington Export Awards.

== Culture ==
=== Venues ===
Wainuiomata has a community centre, a marae, officially opened in 1988, and various churches. The Coast Road Church was built in 1866 and in use until 1958. It is listed by Heritage New Zealand as a Category 2 historic place, and can be hired for weddings or other functions.

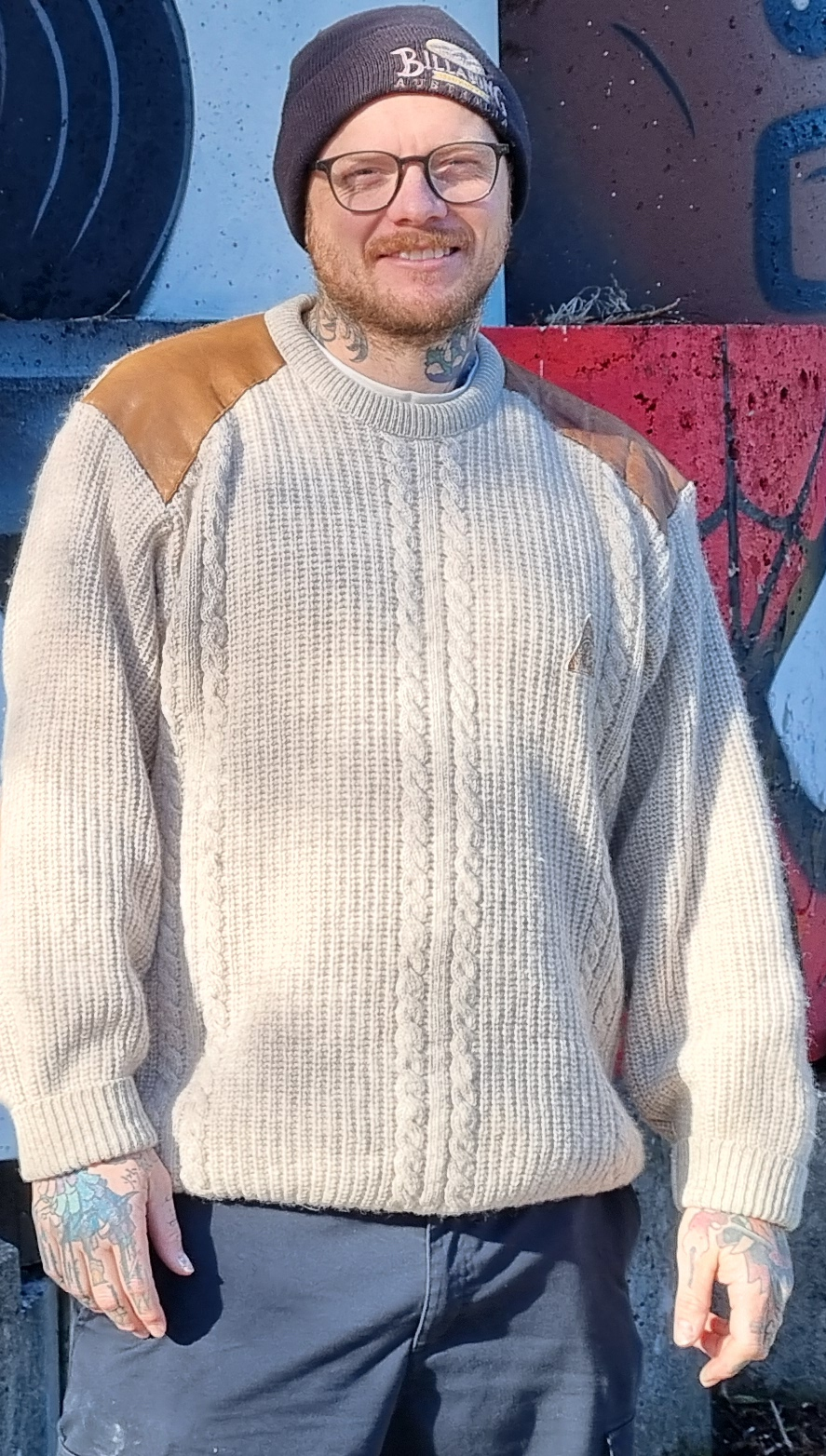
Aidan Walbaekken aka 'Block Vandal' and some of the painted blocks.

=== Arts ===
Wainuiomata hosts the annual Wellington Folk Festival over Labour Weekend in October. The community theatre society is called Wainuiomata Little Theatre and has been operating since 1956. Bruce Mason was the patron when it started.

=== Lego wall ===
On Gracefield Road just before the turn on to the Wainuiomata Hill Road is a retaining wall made of rounded concrete blocks. In 2019 a Wainuiomata man, realising that the shape of the blocks resembled the heads of Lego minifigures, decided to paint them as Lego people. The artist initially remained anonymous, calling himself 'Block Vandal'. The project was well received by Wainuiomata people, some of whom donated money for materials. Hutt City Council promoted the work on social media and said it did not consider the work to be vandalism. Block Vandal chose designs for the heads based on current events and community suggestions. In 2022, Block Vandal was awarded a Kūmara Award. The award, Ahakoa he iti, ko tāna pianga ka puawaitia/ From little things big things grow was given "for playfully transforming drab parts of the city with colorful and joyful art and cultural references". After a hiatus, work on the wall recommenced in 2026, and the artist was revealed as Aidan Walbaekken.

== Recreation and sport ==
Wainuiomata has a large outdoor swimming pool complex. It was completely funded by the community, through raffles, fundraising and an annual Christmas parade, and opened in 1967. The main pool was extended to Olympic length in the early 1970s, and after more community fundraising an 80 metre hydro-slide was added in 1984.

Wainuiomata Regional Park adjoins Remutaka Forest Park, a protected forest park south of Wainuiomata. The park contains swimming spots, walking and cycling trails, as well as access to a disused dam which used to be part of the system supplying Wainuiomata and Wellington City with water. The Wainuiomata Water Collection Area is a restricted-access water catchment reserve to the south-east of the suburb.

Wainuiomata has a popular mountain biking venue at Waiu Park in the hills in the north-west of the suburb. The Wainuiomata Trail Park was developed as a joint initiative by a volunteer group and the Hutt City Council. The park allows for mixed use by runners, walkers and mountain bikers. As of 2024, it includes 57 trails of varying difficulty with a total trail length of 55 km (34 mi).

There is a golf course on the Coast Road to the south of Wainuiomata, opened at its current location in 1970.

Wainuiomata has clubs for rugby union, rugby league and football. Rugby league was particularly prominent in the 1980s and 1990s, with the Wainuiomata Lions team winning a national title three times, but its popularity has waned since then.

== Infrastructure ==
=== Transport ===
The Wainuiomata Hill Road is the only road into and out of Wainuiomata, connecting the suburb with Gracefield and Waiwhetū. Four lanes wide (two in each direction), it is one of the steepest roads in the Wellington region; on the Lower Hutt side, the road climbs 195 metres in 1.9 km, resulting in an average grade of 10.3%.

In 2019 a four-metre wide shared walking and cycling path over the Wainuiomata Hill Road was completed. The path, called Te Hikoi Arawera ('Pathway to the horizon') cost $12.9 million and was funded by Hutt City Council and the New Zealand Transport Agency. On the Wainuiomata side, the path goes up the valley side of the road. At the top of the hill the Pukeatua pedestrian bridge, completed in 2015, crosses over the road and then the path continues down the harbour side of the road to Gracefield. The path also links to mountain bike trails in the surrounding hills.

Two regular bus routes serve Wainuiomata: 160 Wainuiomata North and 170 Wainuiomata South. Both bus routes travel to Lower Hutt Queensgate via Waterloo Interchange, where they connect with Hutt Valley Line train services to Wellington. Route 160 serves the northern neighbourhoods of Parkway, Arakura and Glendale, while route 170 serves the southern neighbourhoods of Fernlea and Homedale; both routes serve the shopping centre. Previously, two peak-hour services, 80N and 80S, followed routes 160 and 170 within Wainuiomata respectively, but travelled via Gracefield and Petone express to central Wellington however these were cancelled in 2022 and there are currently no direct bus services between Wainuiomata and Wellington City.

A branch commuter railway line (see Wainuiomata railway proposals) was proposed at times in the 20th century, but never proceeded. In 2021 a Christchurch-based property development company erroneously advertised new townhouses in Wainuiomata as: "In close proximity to Wainuiomata Train Station with trains departing to Lower Hutt and Wellington regularly makes for an effortless daily commute".

For many years, debates have centred on whether or not a second access road into Wainuiomata should be built. It would connect north Wainuiomata to Naenae and would be valuable if the Wainuiomata Hill Road was unusable for any reason, as well as providing impetus for new housing on the flat land around upper Fitzherbert Road.

=== Shopping precinct ===
Queen Street is Wainuiomata's main shopping area, and there is also a public library and community centre with a large hall. The Queen Street area was revamped in 2022–2023 in the 'Wainuiomata Town Centre' project, which involved landscaping around the community centre. A new road has also been constructed to provide access to a new supermarket which was built after the mall was demolished.

=== Fire brigade ===
Wainuiomata has a volunteer fire brigade, established in 1944 following a major house-fire in 1943. The siren blasts twice in an emergency and can be heard clearly throughout the valley. The first superintendent was Mr J.S. Dunn. The first station was built in 1945 on land opposite Wainuiomata Primary School. The Wainuiomata Development Company donated land and timber to the brigade, with other brigades and companies donating hose, standpipes and ladders. The Stokes Valley brigade supplied a Gwynne Trailer pump.

In the early days any available vehicle would tow the pump and trailer to calls. Often this was a 30-seater bus, as one of the foundation members, Mr Artie Kilmister, was the local bus driver. In 1946 the brigade took delivery of its first "real" fire engine, a Ford V8 Marmon-Herrington 4-wheel-drive. This truck, an ex Air Force tender, remained in service until 1965. It had no flashing lights, only a siren, and on occasions this failed: it was not unusual for members to yell from the truck "get out of the way", or words to that effect.

The Wainuiomata Volunteer Fire Brigade joined the United Fire Brigades Association of New Zealand (UFBA) in 1944.

== Education ==
Between 2001 and 2005, six Wainuiomata schools closed due to falling rolls. Between 2008 and 2021 the population increased but there was a further drop of 818 students enrolled at Wainuiomata schools, with many parents choosing to send their children to schools outside the valley. In 2021, only 50% of local secondary students attended Wainuiomata schools, with the remainder educated outside the valley.

As of 2024, Wainuiomata has eight schools: six primary schools, an intermediate school and a secondary school.

- Arakura School is a state contributing primary (Year 1–6) school in Arakura, and has 148 students as of July 2026.
- Fernlea School is a state contributing primary (Year 1–6) school in Wainuiomata Central, and has 198 students as of July 2026.
- Konini Primary School is a state contributing primary (Year 1–6) school in Parkway, and has 269 students as of July 2026. It was established in 2002 following the merger of Parkway School and Sun Valley School.
- Wainuiomata Primary School is a state contributing primary (Year 1–6) school in Homedale, and has 246 students as of July 2026. It was established in 1857 and merged with Wood Hatton School in 2002.
- Pukeatua Primary School is a state full primary (Year 1–8) school in Glendale, and has 157 students as of July 2026. It was established in 2002 following the merger of Glendale School and Pencarrow School.
- St Claudine Thevenet School is a state-integrated Catholic full primary (Year 1–8) school, and has 189 students as of July 2026. It was established in 2005 following the merger of St Matthew's School and St Patrick's School.
- Wainuiomata Intermediate School is a state intermediate (Year 7–8) school in Parkway, and has 341 students as of July 2026. It was established in 2002 following the merger of Parkway Intermediate School and Wainuiomata Intermediate School.
- Wainuiomata High School is a state secondary (Year 9–13) school in Parkway, and has 707 students as of July 2026. It was established in 2002 following the merger of Parkway College and Wainuiomata College.

=== Kōhanga reo ===
The first kōhanga reo or language nest in New Zealand opened in Wainuiomata in April 1982 as Pukeatua Kōhanga Reo. It was started by Iritana Te Rangi Tāwhiwhirangi DNZM MBE and Wainuiomata resident Jean Puketapu. Kōhanga reo is immersion early childhood education taught by fluent speakers. Pukeatua Kōhanga Reo was a pilot programme in response to less than 5% of Māori school children speaking te reo Māori (the Māori language) fluently. By 1994, not only had kura kaupapa (Māori-immersion primary and secondary schools) also been set up but there were there were 800 kōhanga reo nationwide. The kōhanga reo model has also been taken up by other communities around the world. In 2010, Pukeatua Kōhanga Reo moved to bigger premises on the former Wainuiomata Intermediate site and as of 2022 it was led by Kuini Garthwaite (Ngāti Porou).

== Notable people ==
- Margie Abbott, wife of former Australian prime minister Tony Abbott, grew up in Wainuiomata
- Leo Auva'a, Leinster rugby player
- Frank Brugger, OBE, businessman
- Murray Chandler, Chess Grandmaster
- David Collins (judge) Court of Appeal Judge and former Solicitor-General
- Heath Davis, former Black Cap
- Stephen Kós Supreme Court Judge and former President of the Court of Appeal
- Ken Laban, rugby league player and local body politician
- Winnie Laban, politician
- Beth Mallard, Black Fern and daughter of Trevor Mallard
- Trevor Mallard, MP and Speaker of the House
- Ihakara Puketapu, former Secretary for Maori Affairs
- Jean Puketapu, founder of kōhanga reo
- Neemia Tialata, All Blacks rugby player
- Tana Umaga, All Blacks rugby player
- Piri Weepu, All Blacks rugby player
- Billy Weepu, rugby player
- Tyrel Lomax, All Black rugby player
- Justin Va'a, rugby player
- Earl Va'a, rugby player

== Bibliography ==
- Alexander, Vicky (2000). Tales from the Swamp (Paperback). Wainuiomata: Wainuiomata Historical Museum Society. ISBN 978-0-958-3678-13.
- Carey, Alison (2008). Valleys & Bays – Origins of Street Names in Lower Hutt, including Eastbourne, Petone and Wainuiomata (Paperback). Lower Hutt: Lower Hutt Historical Society. ISBN 978-0-473-13604-8.
