= Homedale, New Zealand =

Suburb of Lower Hutt, New Zealand

Homedale
- Suburb
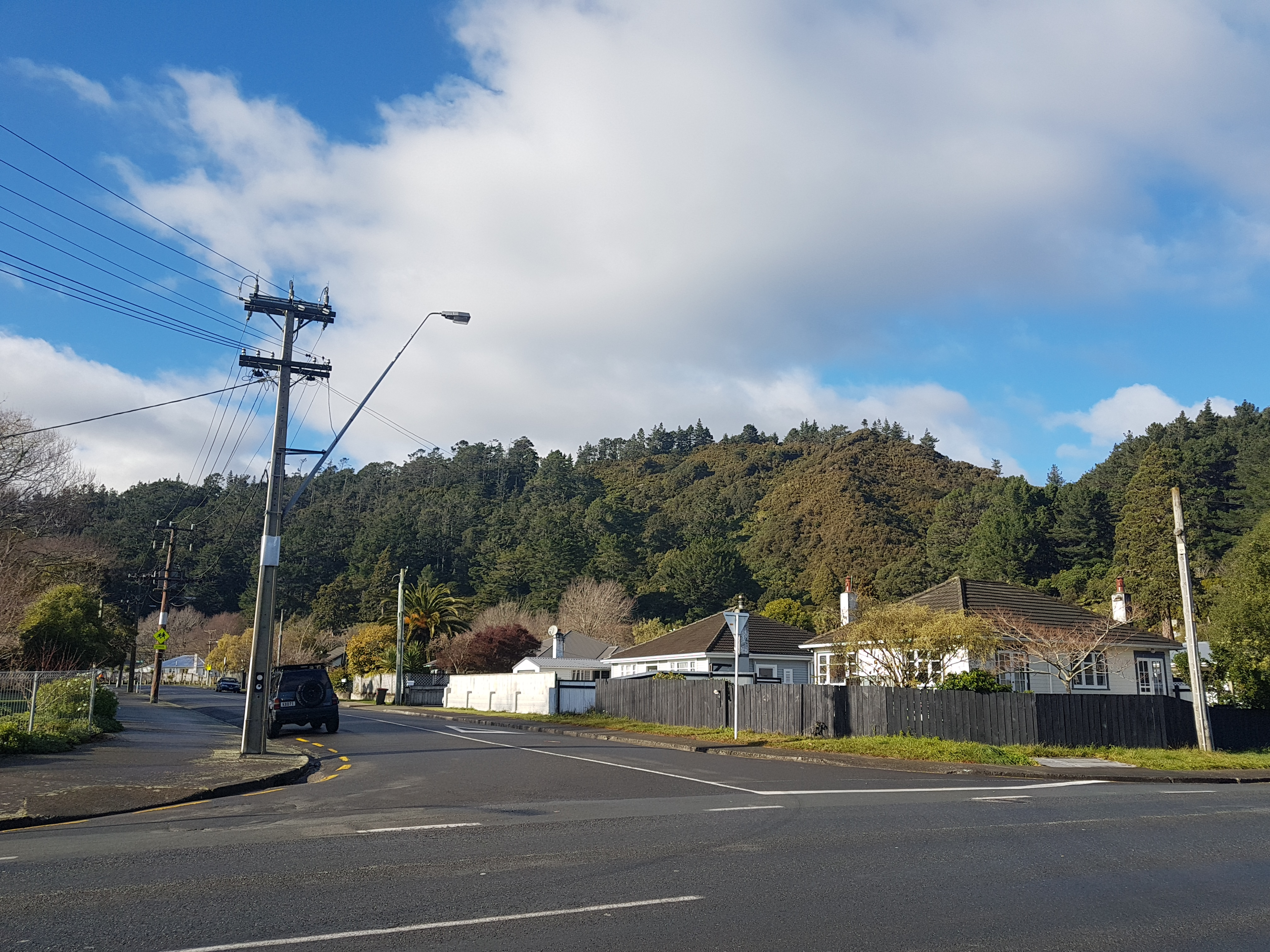
- An image of Homedale
- Interactive map of Homedale
- Coordinates: 41.275°S 174.955°E
- Country: New Zealand
- City: Lower Hutt City
- Electoral ward: Wainuiomata

Area
  - Land: 424 ha (1,050 acres)

Population (June 2025)
  - Total: 6,230
  - Density: 1,470/km^{2} (3,810/sq mi)

Wainuiomata Central	Glendale
	Homedale
Eastbourne

Homedale is a suburb of Wainuiomata, part of Lower Hutt city situated in the lower North Island of New Zealand.

== Demographics ==
Homedale, comprising the statistical areas of Homedale East and Homedale West, covers 4.24 km^{2} (1.64 sq mi). It had an estimated population of 6,230 as of June 2025, with a population density of 1,469 people per km^{2}.

Historical population
Year	Pop.	±% p.a.
2006	5,571	—
2013	5,349	−0.58%
2018	5,694	+1.26%
2023	5,847	+0.53%

Homedale had a population of 5,847 in the 2023 New Zealand census, an increase of 153 people (2.7%) since the 2018 census, and an increase of 498 people (9.3%) since the 2013 census. There were 2,910 males, 2,919 females, and 24 people of other genders in 2,013 dwellings. 4.0% of people identified as LGBTIQ+. There were 1,215 people (20.8%) aged under 15 years, 1,194 (20.4%) aged 15 to 29, 2,769 (47.4%) aged 30 to 64, and 663 (11.3%) aged 65 or older.

People could identify as more than one ethnicity. The results were 68.0% European (Pākehā); 32.4% Māori; 15.1% Pasifika; 10.3% Asian; 0.7% Middle Eastern, Latin American and African New Zealanders (MELAA); and 2.3% other, which includes people giving their ethnicity as "New Zealander". English was spoken by 96.4%, Māori by 9.1%, Samoan by 4.6%, and other languages by 9.6%. No language could be spoken by 2.5% (e.g. too young to talk). New Zealand Sign Language was known by 0.7%. The percentage of people born overseas was 18.2, compared with 28.8% nationally.

Religious affiliations were 32.8% Christian, 2.1% Hindu, 0.4% Islam, 1.6% Māori religious beliefs, 0.8% Buddhist, 0.5% New Age, 0.1% Jewish, and 1.6% other religions. People who answered that they had no religion were 53.5%, and 6.9% of people did not answer the census question.

Of those at least 15 years old, 789 (17.0%) people had a bachelor's or higher degree, 2,697 (58.2%) had a post-high school certificate or diploma, and 1,146 (24.7%) people exclusively held high school qualifications. 405 people (8.7%) earned over $100,000 compared to 12.1% nationally. The employment status of those at least 15 was 2,661 (57.4%) full-time, 492 (10.6%) part-time, and 165 (3.6%) unemployed.

Individual statistical areas
Name	Area (km^{2})	Population	Density (per km^{2})	Dwellings	Median age	Median income
Homedale East	2.93	3,126	1,067	1,068	35.2 years	$47,500
Homedale West	1.31	2,721	2,077	945	34.6 years	$46,100
New Zealand					38.1 years	$41,500

== Education ==
Wainuiomata Primary School is a state contributing primary (Year 1–6) school in Homedale, and has 231 students as of October 2025. It was established in 1857 and merged with Wood Hatton School (opened in 1964) in 2002.
