= Wainuiomata High School =

Location
- Parkway; Wainuiomata; Lower Hutt 5014; New Zealand; 41.2526°S 174.9358°E

Information
- Funding type: State
- Motto: Aspire, Inspire
- Established: January 2002
- Ministry of Education Institution no.: 478
- Principal: Lea Vellenoweth (acting)
- Years offered: 9–13
- Gender: Co-educational
- Enrolment: 707 (July 2026)
- Colours: Bottle green and black
- Socio-economic decile: 3I
- Website: www.wainuiomatahigh.school.nz

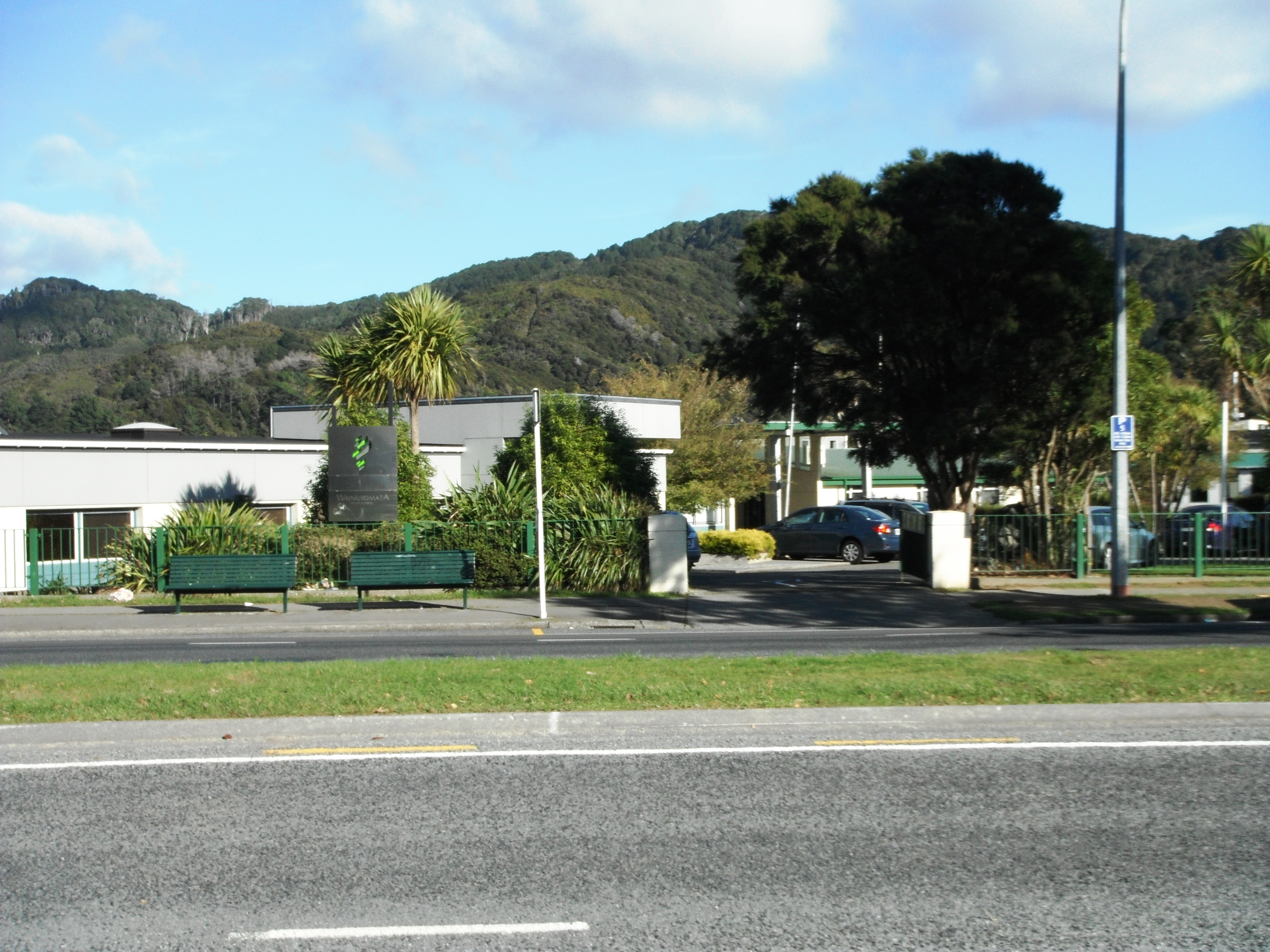
School entrance, May 2013.

Wainuiomata High School, a state co-educational secondary school, operates in Wainuiomata, a suburb of Lower Hutt in New Zealand. The school was founded in January 2002 from the merger of Wainuiomata College and Parkway College. A total of 707 students from Years 9 to 13 (ages 12 to 18) attended the school as of July 2026.

== History ==
In the early 2000s, the government reviewed the entire state school network in Wainuiomata under the direction of Minister of Education (and Wainuiomata resident) Trevor Mallard. At the time, the suburb of 16,000 people had two secondary schools, Wainuiomata College (opened 1963) and Parkway College (opened 1972). Both schools had declining roll numbers and their facilities were underutilised; in the 2001 school year, Wainuiomata College had 450 students and Parkway College had 350 students. It was decided to rationalise the two secondary schools by merging them to form a new single secondary school, Wainuiomata High School on the Parkway site. The merger took effect in January 2002, ready for the 2002 school year.

Parkway College, like most New Zealand state secondary schools built in the 1970s, was constructed the "S68" standard plan. The S68 is characterised by single-story classroom blocks of concrete block construction, with low pitched roofs and internal open courtyards. When the two schools merged on the one site, the combined 800 students exceeded the capacity of the school's three S68 blocks (A, B and C blocks), requiring relocatable classrooms to be moved on site to deal with the extra students. Government funding saw a new five-classroom "social sciences" block (F block) open in early 2004 as a permanent solution. However, the school's roll soon increased to 940 students, requiring the relocatable classrooms to remain.

The old Wainuiomata College site was abandoned, and in 2005, it was used as the filming location for the first series of school-based comedy Seven Periods with Mr Gormsby. Much of the old school was destroyed in an arson attack in July 2010.

== Enrolment ==
Wainuiomata High School does not operate an enrolment scheme, so the school is open to enrolment from any eligible student. Its effective service area is the entire Wainuiomata Valley, although it is easily accessible from most parts of Lower Hutt via the 160 "Wainuiomata North" public bus route, which stops outside the school and connects to Waterloo Interchange railway station and the Queensgate bus interchange in central Lower Hutt. In 2008, it was estimated around 40 students attending the school (or 5% of the roll) resided outside of Wainuiomata.

At the October 2012 Education Review Office (ERO) review of the school, Wainuiomata High School had 830 students, including five international students. The school roll's gender composition was 52% male and 48% female, and its ethnic composition was 41% European New Zealanders (Pākehā), 41% Māori, 13% Pasifika and 5% Other (including Asian).

As of 2026, Wainuiomata High School has an Equity Index of 509, placing it amongst schools whose students have many socioeconomic barriers to achievement (roughly equivalent to deciles 2 and 3 under the former socio-economic decile system).

== Curriculum ==
Wainuiomata High School operates a regular timetable with three 90 minute teaching periods per day, except on Wednesdays and Fridays where they have an extra 50 minute long teaching period.

In Years 9 and 10, English, Mathematics, Science, Social Studies, Physical Education and Health are compulsory core subjects. The school also offers a bilingual class in which the compulsory core subjects (except English) are taught both in English and Te Reo Māori. Year 9 students study Art and Technology subjects on a term rotation system, with students choosing a learning language out of Te Reo Māori, French and Japanese. Year 10 students study three optional subjects of their choice.

In Years 11 to 13, students complete the National Certificate of Educational Achievement (NCEA), the main secondary school qualification in New Zealand. Levels 1, 2 and 3 of NCEA are usually completed in Years 11, 12 and 13 respectively, although students can choose subjects from different levels depending on their progress through the NCEA level system. Students study six subjects per year, with English being compulsory in Years 11 and 12, and Mathematics being compulsory in Year 11.

In 2013, 69.8 percent of students leaving Wainuiomata High held at least NCEA Level 1, 53.1 percent held at least NCEA Level 2, and 24.6 percent held at least University Entrance. This compares nationally to 85.2%, 74.2%, and 49.0% respectively.

== Notable alumni ==
- Margie Abbott (née Aitken; Wainuiomata College) – wife of former Australian Prime Minister Tony Abbott
- Margaret Jeune (née Webb; Wainuiomata College) - poet and photographer
- Tana Umaga (Parkway College) – former professional rugby union player, former All Black captain (2004–05)
