= Māori language revival =

The Māori language revival is a movement to promote, reinforce and strengthen the use of the Māori language (te reo Māori). Primarily in New Zealand, and also in places with large numbers of expatriate New Zealanders (such as Sydney, London and Melbourne), the movement aims to increase the use of Māori in the home, in education, government, and business. The movement is part of a broader revival of tikanga Māori (Māori culture, cultural habits and practices) in what has been called the Māori renaissance.

Until World War II, most Māori people spoke Māori as their first language. By the 1980s, fewer than 20 per cent of Māori spoke the language well enough to be classed as native speakers. The causes of the decline included the switch from using Māori to using English compulsorily in schools and increasing urbanisation, which disconnected younger generations from their extended families—in particular their grandparents, who traditionally played a large part in family life. As a result, many Māori children failed to learn their ancestral language, and generations of non-Māori-speaking Māori emerged.

In response, Māori leaders initiated Māori-language recovery programs such as the kōhanga reo ("language nests") movement, which, beginning in 1982, immersed infants in Māori from infancy to school age. In 1989, official support was given for kura kaupapa Māori—primary and secondary Māori-language immersion schools.

On 14 September 2025, Te Wiki o te Reo Māori (Māori Language Week) celebrated 50 years having been established in 1975.

== Te Wiki o te Reo Māori ==
A government-sponsored initiative, te Wiki o te Reo Māori, Māori Language Week, has been celebrated since 1975 and is intended to encourage New Zealanders to support the language.

== Māori Language Act 1987 and the Māori Language Commission ==
The Māori Language Act 1987 was passed as a response to the Waitangi Tribunal finding that the Māori language was a taonga, a treasure or valued possession, under the Treaty of Waitangi.

The Act gave Māori official-language status, and gave speakers a right to use it in legal settings such as in court. It also established the Māori Language Commission (initially called Te Komihana Mo Te Reo Māori but later renamed Te Taura Whiri i Te Reo Māori) to promote the language and provide advice on it.

== Kōhanga reo ==
Kōhanga reo (Māori for 'language nest') is a whānau (family) development and language-revitalisation initiative grounded in Māori cultural principles and ideals. It facilitates the growth and development of mokopuna (grandchildren) through the transmission of Māori language, knowledge and culture. The kōhanga reo movement operates from the Māori philosophical world view and is principally guided by kaumātua (respected elders).

Individual kōhanga reo are autonomously run by their respective whānau, which consists of a "collective group of teachers, parents, local elders, and members of the Māori community". While funded by governmental quarterly grants from the Te Kōhanga Reo National Trust, kōhanga reo often also charge additional fees to cover operational costs. These fees, determined by each whānau, are generally comparable to or less expensive than traditional child-care. Conducted entirely in Māori, a kōhanga reo is an environment where 0–6-year-olds, kaumātua and whānau spend time together talking, playing, praying and learning. Daily activities may take place anywhere that is safe and warm including marae (traditional community meeting places), converted homes or purpose-built centres.

Emerging in the late 1970s at the direction of kaumātua, kōhanga reo was an immediate and urgent response to the decline of the Māori language and tikanga Māori. Jean Puketapu and Iritana Tawhiwhirangi were among the early leaders when the first kōhanga reo was founded in Wainuiomata in 1982. Three years later there were over 300 operating. The success of kōhanga reo is such that they have been followed by the establishment of primary schools and secondary schools (kura kaupapa Māori) where Māori is the primary language of instruction. The role of Māori language in education in New Zealand is enshrined in the Education Act 1989.

The kōhanga reo concept has led to other before-school initiatives in New Zealand that instruct in Pacific languages, e.g. Fijian, Rarotongan, Samoan, and Tongan and other countries adopting a similar concept. A notable example being Pūnana Leo established in Hawaii to revitalise the indigenous Hawaiian language.

== Kura kaupapa Māori ==
Kura kaupapa Māori are Māori-language-immersion schools.

== Politics ==
Election campaigns by Te Pāti Māori often feature increased roles for the Māori language. In the 2011 election, the party wanted to require that all secondary schools offer the language as an option to every student.

== See also ==
- List of revived languages
- Whakaata Māori (Māori Television)
- Gaelic revival
- Livonian language revival
