= Wainuiomata River =

River in New Zealand

- The Wainuiomata River at Khyber Pass near Baring Head
- Route of the Wainuiomata River
- Mouth of the Wainuiomata River Wainuiomata River (North Island)
- Native name: Wainuiomata (Māori)

Location
- Country: New Zealand
- Island: North Island
- Region: Wellington
- District: Lower Hutt

Physical characteristics
- Source: Wainuiomata River West Branch
  - location: Remutaka Range
  - coordinates: 41.21773°S 175.02839°E
- 2nd source: Wainuiomata River East Branch
  - location: Remutaka Range
  - coordinates: 41.21973°S 175.06774°E
- Mouth: Cook Strait
  - location: Baring Head / Ōrua-pouanui
  - coordinates: 41°24′41″S 174°53′09″E
- Length: 38 km (24 mi)
- Basin size: 134 km^{2} (52 sq mi)

Basin features
- Progression: Wainuiomata River → Cook Strait → Pacific Ocean
- Cities: Wainuiomata
- Tributaries
  - left: Sinclair Creek, George Creek, Sledge Track Creek, Nīkau Creek, Skerretts Creek, Scholes Creek, Catchpool Stream, Karaka Stream, Plumbago Stream
  - right: Skull Gully Stream, Wainuiomata Stream, Black Stream
- Waterbodies: Khyber Pass
- Bridges: Reservoir Road Bridge, Sledge Track bridge, Whakanui Track bridge, Richard Prouse Park footbridge, Wainuiomata Bridge (Main Road), Wainuiomata Golf Club cart bridge 1, Wainuiomata Golf Club cart bridge 2, Baring Head Loop bridge

The Wainuiomata River runs southwest through the Wainuiomata Valley located in the southern Remutaka Range in the North Island, New Zealand.

== Origin of name ==
The word Wainui-o-Mata is a Māori name made up of the elements wai (water), nui (big), o (of) and Mata – which could refer to a woman's name. The origins of the name remain disputed, but one commonly accepted explanation refers to women who came over the Wainuiomata Hill to evade marauding tribes from the north, and who sat wailing by the stream after the slaughter of their menfolk. From this we have "faces streaming with water" or "tears" - although the name could equally refer to the large pools of water which lay over the swampy surface (face) of the northern end of the Valley, or to the river itself, which can flood the Wainui (Coast Road) valley.

Today it is commonly called the "Wainui River", as the suburb of Wainuiomata is informally named "Wainui".

== Geography ==
The river originates in the southwestern Remutaka Ranges, flowing southwest. The upper catchment is formed by steep hills and valleys entirely covered by native forests, until the river flows into the Wainuiomata Water Treatment Plant. The lower catchment past the plant has a uniform gradient.

== History ==
The earliest settlements were based around the river where the timber mills supplied the Wellington region where the demand was great in the 1850s and 1860s. Today this area is known as "The Village" or as "Homedale".

In 1879 the Wellington ratepayers voted to extend their water supply, and by 1884 a dam was built in Sinclair Valley (Waterworks Valley) and a pipeline ran across the Wainuiomata Valley floor, through a tunnel under the hill, and on to Wellington. This dam was replaced in 1910 with the Morton Dam since decommissioned, while the Ōrongorongo tunnel and pipelines were implemented by 1926. The establishment of the waterworks meant the coming of the telephone although, by 1921, there were still only two subscribers.

As of 2016 the Wainuiomata/Ōrongorongo Catchment Area is a restricted area as it supplies much of the Wellington region with water.

== Gallery ==
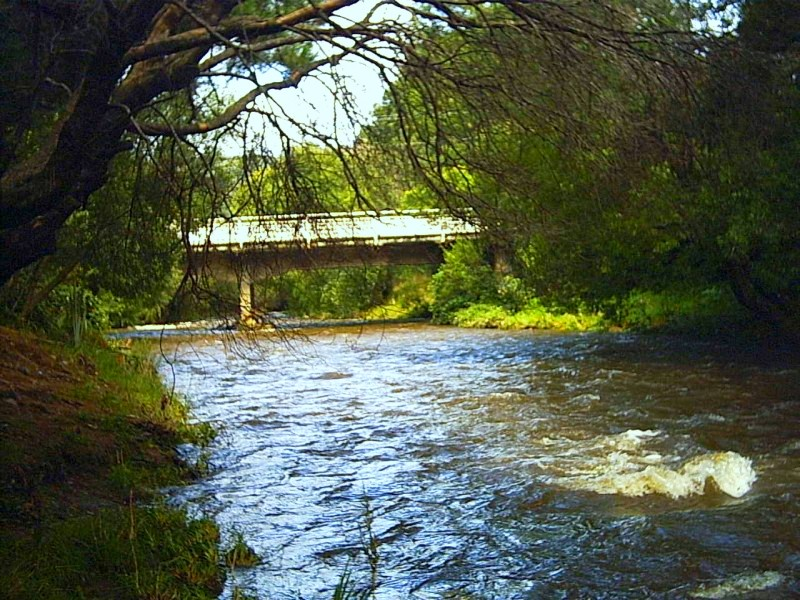
The bridge that crosses the river near The Village

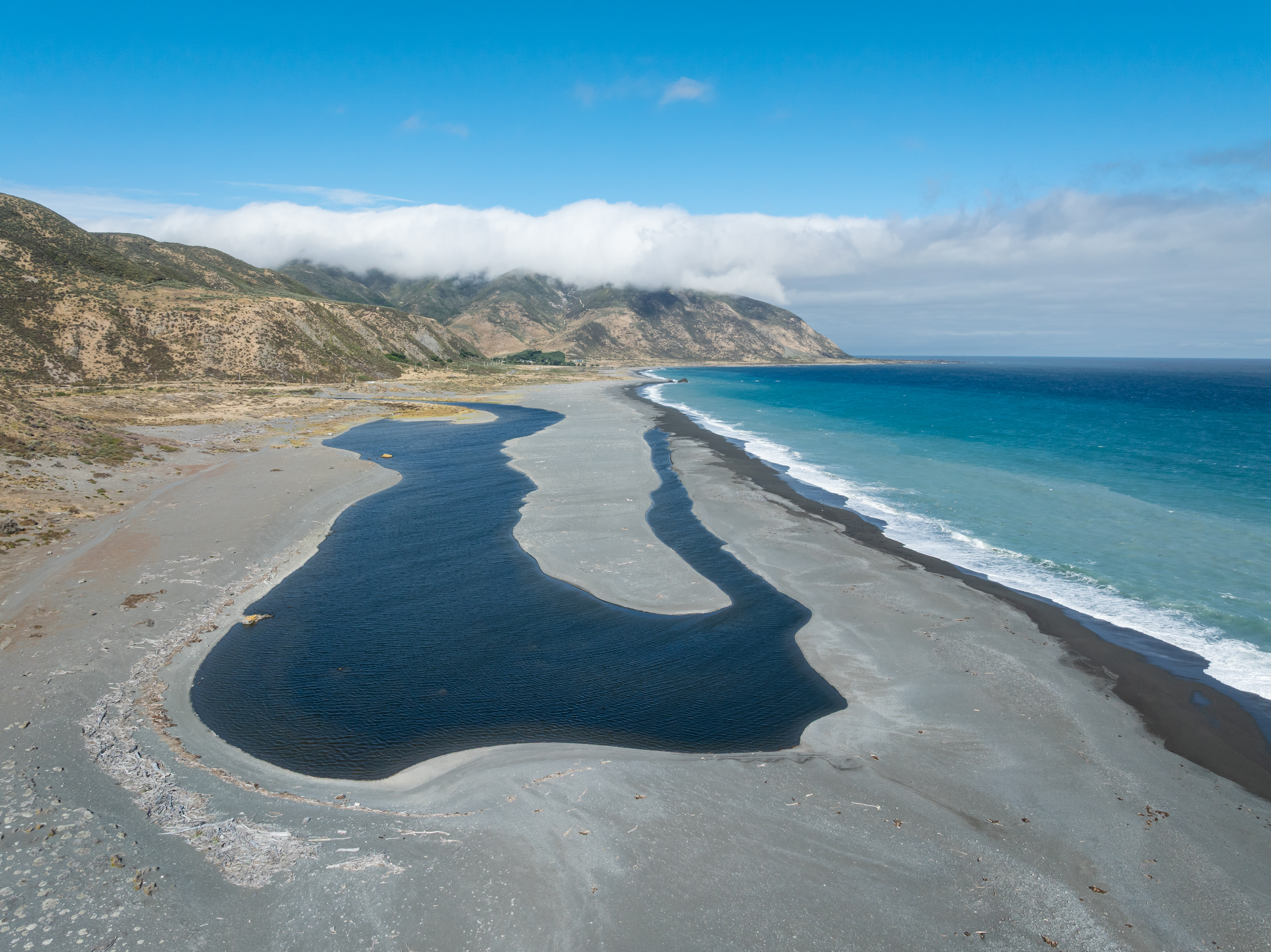
Aerial Mouth of the Wainuiomata River flowing into Cook Strait

== See also ==
- List of rivers of Wellington Region
- List of rivers of New Zealand
