= Ralph Bunche (disambiguation) =

Ralph Bunche may refer to:

- Ralph Bunche (1904–1971), American political scientist, academic and diplomat, recipient of 1950 Nobel Peace Prize
- Ralph J. Bunche III (born 1979), American lawyer and politician, General Secretary of UNPO

== Places ==
- Ralph Bunche Park, Turtle Bay, New York City, NY, USA
- Ralph Bunche House (disambiguation), a number of houses:
  - Ralph Johnson Bunche House, Queens, New York
  - Ralph Bunche House (Washington, D.C.)
  - Ralph J. Bunche House, Los Angeles, California
- Ralph Bunche High School, King George, Virginia
- Ralph J. Bunche Library, Washington, D.C.
- Ralph J. Bunche International Affairs Center, at Howard University, Washington, D.C.

== See also ==
- Bunche
