= Parkway (disambiguation) =

A parkway is a landscaped thoroughfare (road).

Parkway or Park Way may also refer to:

== Transportation ==
=== Road ===
- A scenic route, or a road giving access through, or into, a park or an area of wilderness
- A controlled-access highway, especially one which is more scenic or particularly suited to light vehicles, or for recreational motoring
- A North American regional term for a road verge: the space between a sidewalk and a roadway, often containing grass or trees

=== Rail ===
- A park and ride railway station, including the many stations in Great Britain with 'Parkway' in their name

== Places ==
=== Brazil ===
- Park Way, Federal District

=== England ===
- Parkway, Camden, a street in London
- Parkway, Herefordshire
- Parkway Newbury, a retail and residential development in Newbury, Berkshire

=== New Zealand ===
- Parkway, New Zealand, a suburb of Wainuiomata, Lower Hutt

=== United States ===
- Parkway, Boston, a section of Roslindale and West Roxbury, Boston, Massachusetts
- Parkway, California, a census-designated place in Sacramento County
- Parkway, Missouri, a village

=== Other places ===
- Parkway Village (disambiguation)

== Other ==
- Parkway (St. John's), a road in St. John's, Newfoundland and Labrador
- Parkway Drive, an Australian metalcore band
- Parkway High School (disambiguation)
- Parkway School District, a school district in St. Louis, Missouri
