= Dewayne Bunch =

Dewayne Bunch or DeWayne Bunch may refer to:

- Dewayne Bunch (Kentucky politician) (1962–2012), Republican politician and member of the Kentucky state legislature
- Dewayne Bunch (Tennessee politician) (born 1959), Republican politician who served in the Tennessee state legislature

== See also ==
- Bunch (surname)
- Bunch (disambiguation)
