= Ralph Bunche House =

Ralph Bunche House may refer to:

- Ralph Johnson Bunche House, Queens, New York, a National Historic Landmark and listed on the National Register of Historic Places in Queens County, New York
- Ralph Bunche House (Washington, D.C.), listed on the National Register of Historic Places in Washington, D.C.
- Ralph J. Bunche House, Los Angeles, California, listed on the National Register of Historic Places in Los Angeles County, California

== See also ==
- Ralph Bunche Historic District, Glasgow, Kentucky, listed on the National Register of Historic Places listings in Barren County, Kentucky
- Ralph Bunche High School, King George, Virginia, listed on the NRHP in Virginia
