= Charlie Siler =

American politician (1929–2024)

Member of the Kentucky House of Representatives from the 82nd district
- In office January 1, 1995 – January 1, 2011
- Preceded by: Jo Elizabeth Bryant
- Succeeded by: Dewayne Bunch
- In office January 1, 1985 – January 1, 1991
- Preceded by: Elmer Patrick
- Succeeded by: Jo Elizabeth Bryant

Personal details
- Born: June 30, 1929 Alva, Kentucky, U.S.
- Died: April 23, 2024 (aged 94) Corbin, Kentucky, U.S.
- Party: Republican

Charles Lewis Siler (June 30, 1929 – April 23, 2024) was an American politician from Kentucky who was a member of the Kentucky House of Representatives from 1985 to 1991 and again from 1995 to 2011.

== Political career ==
Siler was first elected in 1984 after defeating incumbent representative Elmer Patrick in the May primary election. He served in the house until he was defeated for renomination in 1990 by Jo Elizabeth Bryant. Siler returned to the house in 1994 when Bryant retired and served until being defeated for renomination again in 2010 by Dewayne Bunch.

== Personal life and death ==
Siler was born on June 30, 1929, in Alva, Kentucky. He died in Corbin, Kentucky, on April 23, 2024, at the age of 94.
