= Bunche =

Bunche is a surname. Notable people with the surname include:

- Malcolm Bunche (born 1991), American football offensive guard
- Ralph Bunche (1903–1971), American political scientist, academic and diplomat
- Ralph J. Bunche III (born 1979), American lawyer and diplomat, grandson of above

== See also ==
- Bunch (surname)
