= Bunch (surname) =

Bunch is a surname. According to George Fraser Black (The Surnames of Scotland, 1946), it is "a surname peculiar to Perth and neighbourhood, and found in Perth so early as first half of the fifteenth century".

== Surname ==
Notable people with the surname include:

- Arnold W. Bunch Jr. (born 1962), United States Air Force general
- Arthur Bunch (1909–1973), English football player
- Bradley Bunch (1818–1894), American state legislator, judge and historian from Arkansas
- Carl Bunch (1939–2011), American musician
- Charles Bunch (born 1950), American businessman
- Charlotte Bunch (born 1944), American feminist author
- Chris Bunch (1943–2005), American science fiction and television writer
- David R. Bunch (1925–2000), American writer of short stories and poet
- Derek Bunch (born 1961), American football player
- Dewayne Bunch (Kentucky politician) (1962–2012), American politician
- Dewayne Bunch (Tennessee politician) (born 1959), American politician
- Greg Bunch (born 1956), American basketball player
- Jarrod Bunch (born 1968), American football player and actor
- Jim Bunch (born 1956), American football player and businessman
- John Bunch (1921–2010), American jazz pianist
- Jon Bunch (1970–2016), American rock singer and songwriter
- Josephine Bunch, British physicist
- Kenji Bunch (born 1973), American violist and composer
- Kenneth Cecil Bunch (1919–1942), United States Naval Aviator
- Lonnie Bunch (born 1952), American educator and historian
- Madeline Bunch, American entrepreneur from California
- Matt Bunch, American politician from Oregon
- Melvin Bunch (born 1971), American baseball pitcher
- Pat Bunch (1939–2023), American country music songwriter
- Regina Bunch (born 1962), American educator and politician
- Robert Bunch (1820–1881), British diplomat and secret agent
- Samuel Bunch (1786–1849), American politician
- Shawn Bunch (born 1983), American wrestler and mixed martial artist
- Tyler Bunch (born 1970), American puppeteer, puppet designer, director and actor
- Walter Bunch (1872–1937), English footballer

== Geographical distribution ==
At the time of the United Kingdom Census of 1881, the frequency of the surname Bunch was highest in the following counties, by order of frequency:

1. Hampshire (1: 6,807)
2. Angus (1: 6,940)
3. Staffordshire (1: 13,367)
4. Warwickshire (1: 15,820)
5. Essex (1: 30,338)
6. Middlesex (1: 33,583)
7. Hertfordshire (1: 40,344)
8. Kent (1: 41,564)
9. Worcestershire (1: 42,350)
10. Lincolnshire (1: 42,514)

As of 2014, the frequency of the surname was highest in the following countries:

1. Anguilla (1: 6,726)
2. The Bahamas (1: 10,042)
3. United States (1: 12,781)
4. Denmark (1: 31,863)
5. Scotland (1: 42,400)
6. England (1: 74,896)
7. Australia (1: 94,643)
8. Canada (1: 159,583)
9. Colombia (1: 170,450)
10. New Zealand (1: 216,512)

As of 2014, 90.9% of all known bearers of the surname Bunch were residents of the United States. The frequency of the surname was higher than the national average in the following states:

1. Tennessee (1: 3,206)
2. Kentucky (1: 3,387)
3. Arkansas (1: 4,744)
4. Missouri (1: 5,264)
5. Oklahoma (1: 5,271)
6. Mississippi (1: 5,508)
7. Indiana (1: 5,782)
8. North Carolina (1: 5,981)
9. South Carolina (1: 6,345)
10. Georgia (1: 7,832)
11. Virginia (1: 8,003)
12. Alaska (1: 8,409)
13. Louisiana (1: 9,551)
14. Nevada (1: 9,569)
15. Oregon (1: 9,822)
16. Alabama (1: 10,430)
17. Idaho (1: 11,168)
18. Texas (1: 11,626)
19. Kansas (1: 11,809)
20. West Virginia (1: 12,068)
21. New Mexico (1: 12,696)

The frequency of the surname was highest (over 20 times the national average) in the following U.S. counties:

1. Chowan County, N.C. (1: 77)
2. Morgan County, Tenn. (1: 133)
3. Wayne County, Miss. (1: 173)
4. Russell County, Ky. (1: 250)
5. Wilkes County, Ga. (1: 271)
6. Whitley County, Ky. (1: 277)
7. Adair County, Okla. (1: 277)
8. Bertie County, N.C. (1: 279)
9. Lewis County, Tenn. (1: 299)
10. Perquimans County, N.C. (1: 302)
11. Metcalfe County, Ky. (1: 312)
12. Hancock County, Tenn. (1: 318)
13. Barren County, Ky. (1: 321)
14. Ellsworth County, Kan. (1: 337)
15. Anderson County, Tenn. (1: 343)
16. Bamberg County, S.C. (1: 386)
17. Claiborne County, Tenn. (1: 445)
18. Rush County, Kan. (1: 455)
19. Adair County, Mo. (1: 457)
20. Wayne County, Tenn. (1: 458)
21. Roane County, Tenn. (1: 461)
22. Fayette County, Ind. (1: 468)
23. Perry County, Tenn. (1: 492)
24. Gordon County, Ga. (1: 502)
25. Hamblen County, Tenn. (1: 505)
26. Hertford County, N.C. (1: 509)
27. Ohio County, Ky. (1: 533)
28. Adair County, Ky. (1: 535)
29. Meigs County, Tenn. (1: 555)
30. Campbell County, Tenn. (1: 559)
31. Howell County, Mo. (1: 585)
32. Baker County, Ore. (1: 593)
33. Lander County, Nev. (1: 603)
34. Gates County, N.C. (1: 613)

== See also ==
- Bunche, another surname
