= Bunching =

Bunching can refer to:

- Bunching (mathematics), also known as Muirhead's inequality.
- Bunching (animals), the practice of stealing pets for laboratories.
- Bus bunching, two or more transit vehicles running together despite evenly spaced scheduling
- Photon bunching, in physics, the statistical tendency for photons to arrive simultaneously at a detector

Within the Wikipedia community it can also refer to:

- A term for section edit buttons showing up after images or textboxes—see Wikipedia:How to fix bunched-up edit links.

== See also ==
- Bunch (disambiguation)
- Bunch (surname)
