= Bunch =

Bunch may refer to:

- Bunch (surname)
- Bunch Davis (fl. 1906–1911), American baseball player in the Negro leagues
- BUNCH, nickname of five computer manufacturing companies, IBM's main competitors in the 1970s
- Tussock (grass) or bunch grass, members of the family Poaceae
- Bunch, Oklahoma, United States
- Bunch Creek, Placer County, California, United States
- The Bunch, a 1972 British folk rock group
- USS Bunch (DE-694), a United States Navy destroyer escort
- Humpback whale, sometimes called a bunch

== See also ==
- Bunch Reservoir, Apache County, Arizona, United States
- Wild Bunch (disambiguation)
- Brunch
- Bunches
- Bunching (disambiguation)
