= Raymond Leslie Buell =

American social scientist (1896–1946)

- Born: July 13, 1896; Chicago, Illinois, U.S.
- Died: February 20, 1946 (aged 49); Montreal, Quebec, Canada
- Education: Occidental College (A.B.); University of Grenoble; Princeton University (M.A., Ph.D.)
- Occupations: Social scientist; Educator; Publicist
- Employers: Harvard University; Foreign Policy Association
- Known for: Critique of isolationism and economic nationalism; International Relations (1925); The Native Problem in Africa (1928); Isolated America (1940)
- Spouse: Frances March Dwight (m. 1928–1946)
- Children: 2

Raymond Leslie Buell (July 13, 1896 – February 20, 1946) was an American social scientist. He was an assistant professor at Harvard University until 1927 when he became research director at the Foreign Policy Association. He later became president of the Foreign Policy Association.

Buell was a prominent critic of isolationism in the United States in the lead-up to World War II. A critic of economic nationalism, Buell argued for free trade treaties. A critic of imperialism and racial supremacy, Buell argued for retaining native tribal institutions in Africa. He influenced the work of Ralph Bunche.

== Early life and education ==
Buell was born in Chicago, Illinois on July 13, 1896. His father was a minister at the Presbyterian Church. He graduated with an A.B. from Occidental College. He served in the American Expeditionary Force during World War I.

He wrote his 1920 book Contemporary French Politics while a student at the University of Grenoble. He earned a masters in 1920 and a PhD in 1922 from Princeton University. From 1920 to 1921, he was Assistant professor of history and economics at Occidental College.

== Career ==
After receiving his PhD in 1922, he began working as an instructor and researcher at Harvard University. He became assistant professor at Harvard University in 1926 but gave up his position in 1927 after becoming research director at the Foreign Policy Association.

He authored the influential 1925 textbook International Relations. In the book, he flags nationalism as a powerful driver of international conflict, as it prompts conflict within empires and stokes tensions between states about borders. He argues that imperialism, which he described as "evil", provokes conflict between imperial powers and between empires and the groups that the empires tries to conquer and subjugate. He challenged notions that pure races existed and that one race was superior to other races, as well as argued that modern nations were composed of multiple races. He criticized economic nationalism and argued for free trade treaties. He opposed the U.S. policy of excluding Asians from immigration and citizenship.

He authored The Native Question in Africa, which was a comparative study of colonial rule. Buell argues in the book for retaining native tribal institutions in Africa. He opposed U.S. isolationism in the years leading up to World War II. He authored the book Isolated America in 1940.

Buell ran for Congress in 1942, losing to Allen T. Treadway in an election for Massachusetts's first congressional district.

== Works (partial list) ==
- Contemporary French Politics (1920)
- "Political and Social Reconstruction in France" American Political Science Review, Feb. 1921
- The Washington Conference (1922)
- Buell, Raymond Leslie (1923). "Some Legal Aspects of the Japanese Question". American Journal of International Law. 17 (1): 29–49.
- "Again the Yellow Peril" Foreign Affairs, Dec. 15, 1923
- International Relations (1925)
- Europe: A History of Ten Years (1928)
- The Native Problem in Africa (1928)
- New Governments in Europe. 1934.
- Democratic Governments in Europe. 1935.
- Liberia: A Century of Survival, 1847-1947 (1947). University of Pennsylvania Press.

== Personal life ==
He married Frances March Dwight in 1928. They had a son and daughter. He died in Montreal, Canada on February 20, 1946.
