= Arakura =

Suburb of Lower Hutt, New Zealand

- Suburb
- Interactive map of Arakura
- Coordinates: 41.239°S 174.947°E
- Country: New Zealand
- City: Lower Hutt City
- Local authority: Hutt City Council
- Electoral ward: Wainuiomata
- Community board: Wainuiomata Community

Area
  - Land: 196 ha (480 acres)

Population (June 2025)
  - Total: 3,020
  - Density: 1,540/km^{2} (3,990/sq mi)

Gracefield	Arakura
Parkway	Glendale

Arakura is a northern suburb of Wainuiomata, part of Lower Hutt city situated in the lower (southern) North Island of New Zealand. It was developed in the 1950s and 1960s, when farmland was subdivided for state and private housing.

== Location ==
The location of Arakura hasn't been officially designated and usage of the name varies between a north-south and an east-west split with Glendale. For the statistical area, Arakura lies to the west of Black Creek, Glendale is to the east and both are north of Parkway and Nelson Crescent. For local councils and as an unofficial name used by the New Zealand Geographic Board, Arakura is to the north of Glendale, the boundary being about Devon Street to Thirlmere Street; Devon Street was the limit of development, as shown in the 1954 image below.

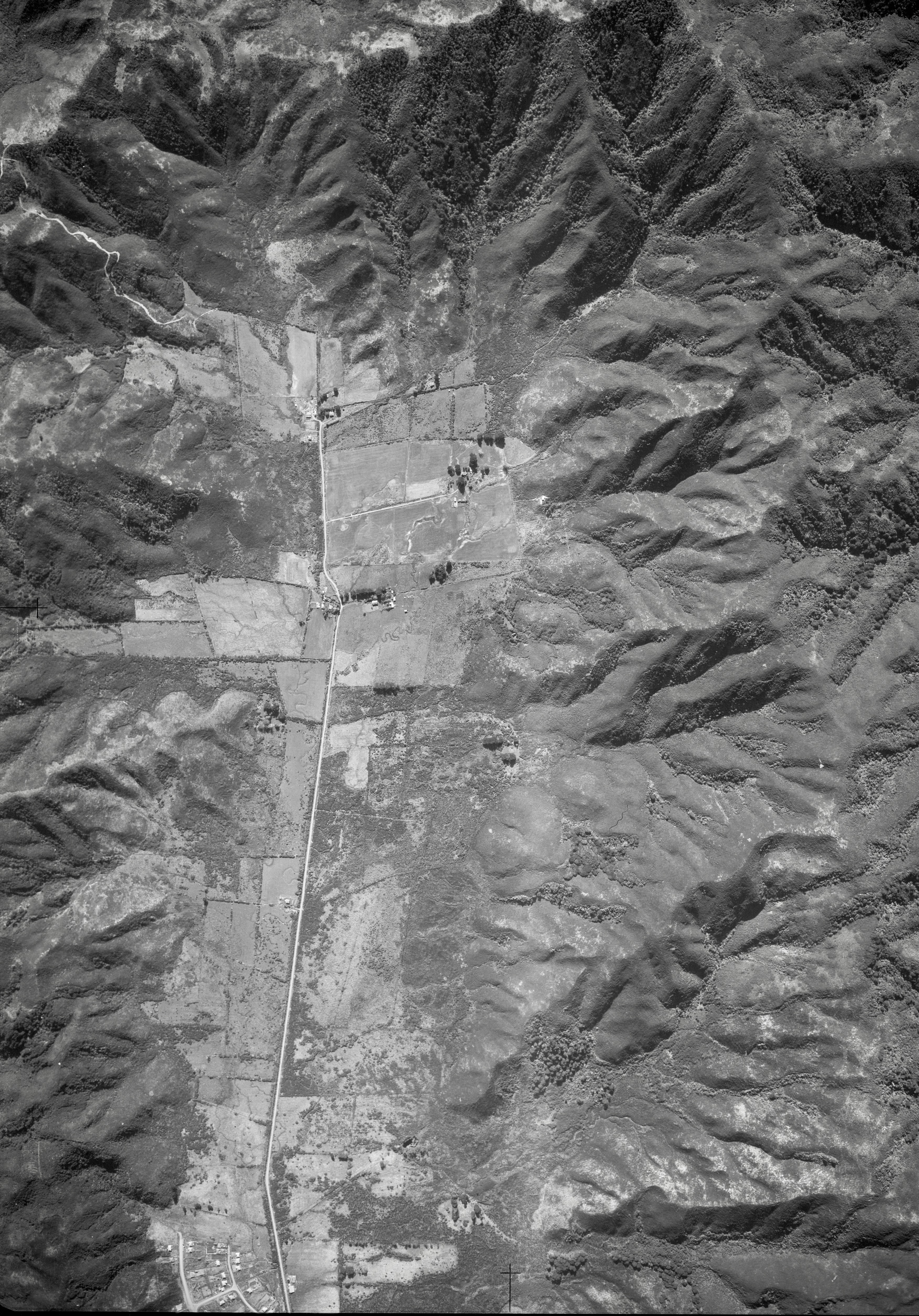
Arakura in 1954

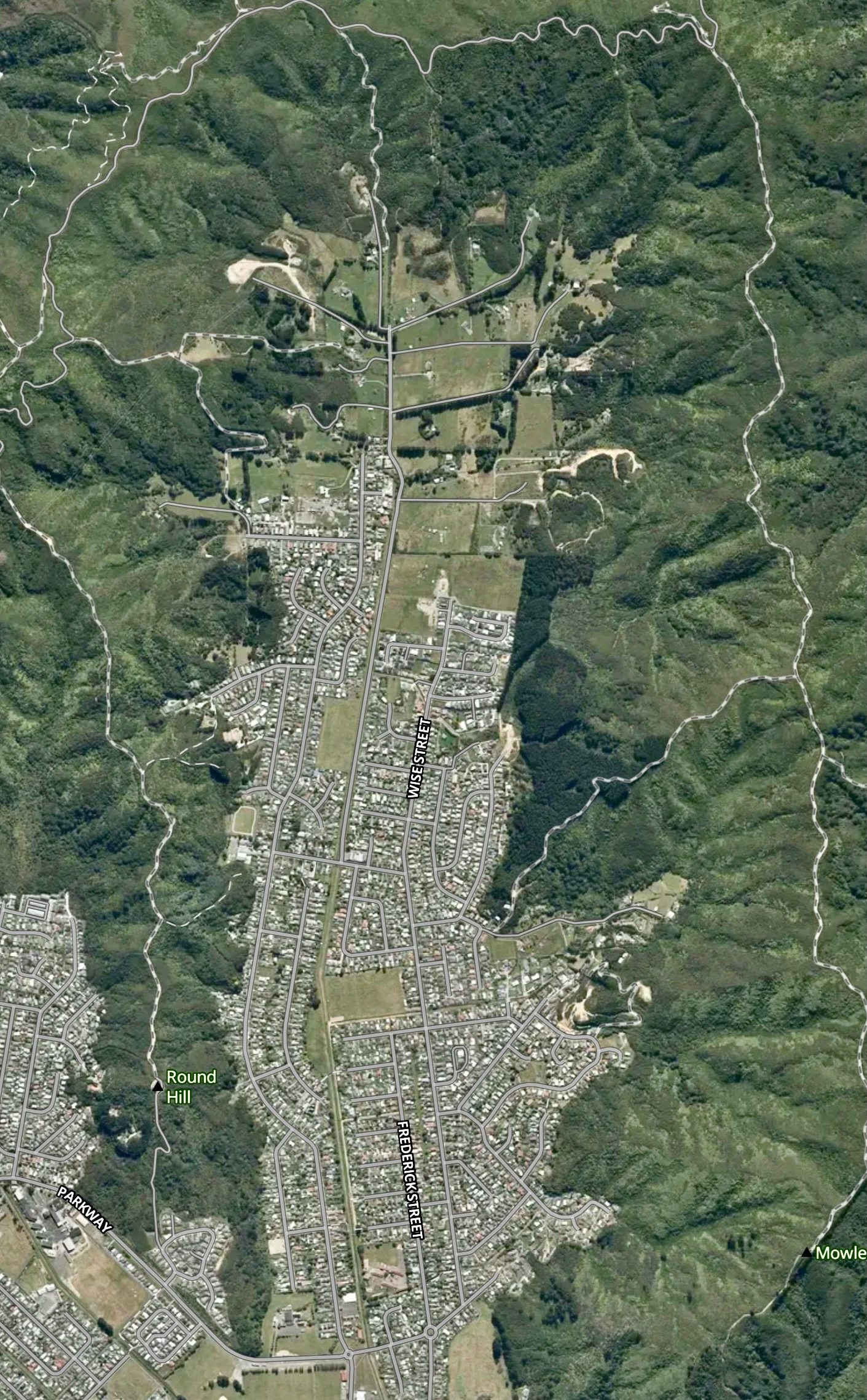
in 2025

== Demographics ==
Arakura statistical area covers 1.96 km^{2} (0.76 sq mi). It had an estimated population of 3,020 as of June 2025, with a population density of 1,541 people per km^{2}.

Historical population
Year	Pop.	±% p.a.
2006	2,469	—
2013	2,445	−0.14%
2018	2,793	+2.70%
2023	2,844	+0.36%

Arakura had a population of 2,844 in the 2023 New Zealand census, an increase of 51 people (1.8%) since the 2018 census, and an increase of 399 people (16.3%) since the 2013 census. There were 1,419 males, 1,419 females, and 9 people of other genders in 960 dwellings. 3.3% of people identified as LGBTIQ+. The median age was 33.3 years (compared with 38.1 years nationally). There were 657 people (23.1%) aged under 15 years, 582 (20.5%) aged 15 to 29, 1,323 (46.5%) aged 30 to 64, and 285 (10.0%) aged 65 or older.

People could identify as more than one ethnicity. The results were 61.3% European (Pākehā); 33.2% Māori; 17.9% Pasifika; 13.8% Asian; 1.2% Middle Eastern, Latin American and African New Zealanders (MELAA); and 1.4% other, which includes people giving their ethnicity as "New Zealander". English was spoken by 95.0%, Māori by 8.9%, Samoan by 5.4%, and other languages by 11.3%. No language could be spoken by 3.1% (e.g. too young to talk). New Zealand Sign Language was known by 0.3%. The percentage of people born overseas was 21.0, compared with 28.8% nationally.

Religious affiliations were 31.8% Christian, 3.1% Hindu, 0.3% Islam, 1.9% Māori religious beliefs, 1.1% Buddhist, 0.6% New Age, 0.1% Jewish, and 2.8% other religions. People who answered that they had no religion were 52.6%, and 5.9% of people did not answer the census question.

Of those at least 15 years old, 330 (15.1%) people had a bachelor's or higher degree, 1,278 (58.4%) had a post-high school certificate or diploma, and 582 (26.6%) people exclusively held high school qualifications. The median income was $45,600, compared with $41,500 nationally. 162 people (7.4%) earned over $100,000 compared to 12.1% nationally. The employment status of those at least 15 was 1,284 (58.7%) full-time, 240 (11.0%) part-time, and 81 (3.7%) unemployed.

== Education ==
Arakura School is a coeducational state primary school for years 1 to 6 with a roll of 140 as at March 2026. It opened in 1964. Arakura translates as pathway to learning, a name suggested by Īhāia Puketapu in 1965. A fire lit at the school on 16 October 1991 cost about $500,000 for five classrooms, a storage room and a boiler room.

Across the road from the school is Arakura Kindergarten, which provides for about 40 children.

Pencarrow Primary School was at 110 Wise Street from 1966 to 2001, now redeveloped for housing as Fraser Colman Grove. It merged with Glendale School to form Pukeatua Primary School in 2002.

== Tracks ==
A rough track for cyclists and horses links the school to Kōnini Firebreak Track, on the ridge above. and another links Hastings Grove to the Kōnini Track. Kōnini is a fruit of the kōtukutuku tree. They link on what was a Māori Track, to Parkway and to a 1959 concrete reservoir on Round Hill.

== Parks ==
Arakura Park has a late 20th century recreational building and a children's playground. It takes its name from the school, is beside Black Creek Reserve and was used as a soccer ground for many years but is now used as a recreation park.

Black Creek has water poor quality. It flows to the Wainuiomata River. Its dark staining is from tannins released from the swamp which covered the valley floor until the 1880s. What is now Fitzherbert and Upper Fitzherbert Road ran alongside the creek and were known as Swamp Road. This area housed a flax mill and residential buildings at the base of the hills.

Grimsby Grove Recreation Reserve dates from the 1980s.

Mary Crowther Park was called Russell Road Park until renamed in 1964. Mary Ursula Crowther (1869–1958) lived in the neighbouring Moores Valley. It is used as a rugby ground, with 1969 changing rooms and toilets. Black Creek Reserve runs beside the park. Mary Crowther kept diaries and donated land for Brookfield scout camp.

== Buses ==
Arakura is served by Hutt Valley buses. From 11 April 2004 Arakura and Glendale was served by route 170, generally running every 30 minutes and 160 to the end of Wellington Road. Now only 160 serves Ahakura.

== Shops ==
Norfolk Street is an early 1960s local neighbourhood retail strip between Arakura and Pencarrow, including a small supermarket or superette and takeaway food outlets. By 1967 Norfolk Street was mentioned in public records as a shopping area. In 1986 $19,000 was stolen from the post office. A 615 signature petition failed to keep it open and it closed from 5 February 1988 when Postmaster-General, Richard Prebble, closed or reduced 580 offices.
