= Glendale, New Zealand =

Suburb of Lower Hutt, New Zealand

Glendale
- Suburb
- Interactive map of Glendale
- Coordinates: 41.2556°S 174.9502°E
- Country: New Zealand
- City: Lower Hutt City
- Local authority: Hutt City Council
- Electoral ward: Wainuiomata
- Community board: Wainuiomata Community

Area
  - Land: 321 ha (790 acres)

Population (June 2025)
  - Total: 4,800
  - Density: 1,500/km^{2} (3,900/sq mi)

| | Arakura |
| Parkway | Glendale |
| Wainuiomata Central | Homedale |

Glendale is a suburb of Wainuiomata, part of Lower Hutt city situated in the lower North Island of New Zealand.

== Demographics ==
Glendale statistical area covers 3.21 km^{2} (1.24 sq mi). It had an estimated population of 4,800 as of June 2025, with a population density of 1,495 people per km^{2}.

Historical population
| Year | Pop. | ±% p.a. |
|---|---|---|
| 2006 | 3,633 | — |
| 2013 | 3,801 | +0.65% |
| 2018 | 4,050 | +1.28% |
| 2023 | 4,452 | +1.91% |

Glendale had a population of 4,452 in the 2023 New Zealand census, an increase of 402 people (9.9%) since the 2018 census, and an increase of 651 people (17.1%) since the 2013 census. There were 2,265 males, 2,178 females, and 12 people of other genders in 1,407 dwellings. 2.8% of people identified as LGBTIQ+. The median age was 33.2 years (compared with 38.1 years nationally). There were 1,047 people (23.5%) aged under 15 years, 903 (20.3%) aged 15 to 29, 2,109 (47.4%) aged 30 to 64, and 390 (8.8%) aged 65 or older.

People could identify as more than one ethnicity. The results were 58.0% European (Pākehā); 35.2% Māori; 16.2% Pasifika; 16.2% Asian; 1.7% Middle Eastern, Latin American and African New Zealanders (MELAA); and 1.5% other, which includes people giving their ethnicity as "New Zealander". English was spoken by 95.6%, Māori by 9.4%, Samoan by 5.6%, and other languages by 12.3%. No language could be spoken by 2.8% (e.g. too young to talk). New Zealand Sign Language was known by 0.6%. The percentage of people born overseas was 20.8, compared with 28.8% nationally.

Religious affiliations were 31.7% Christian, 5.6% Hindu, 1.2% Islam, 2.0% Māori religious beliefs, 0.5% Buddhist, 0.5% New Age, and 1.7% other religions. People who answered that they had no religion were 50.2%, and 6.5% of people did not answer the census question.

Of those at least 15 years old, 567 (16.7%) people had a bachelor's or higher degree, 1,911 (56.1%) had a post-high school certificate or diploma, and 930 (27.3%) people exclusively held high school qualifications. The median income was $48,800, compared with $41,500 nationally. 309 people (9.1%) earned over $100,000 compared to 12.1% nationally. The employment status of those at least 15 was 2,010 (59.0%) full-time, 378 (11.1%) part-time, and 135 (4.0%) unemployed.

== Education ==
Pukeatua Primary School is a state full primary (Year 1–8) school, and has 154 students as of October 2025. It was established in 2002 following the merger of Glendale School (opened 1958) and Pencarrow School (opened 1966).
