= Parkway High School =

Parkway High School may refer to:

- Parkway High School (Louisiana), Bossier City, Louisiana
- Parkway High School (Ohio), Rockford, Ohio

== See also ==
- Parkway Center City High School, Philadelphia, Pennsylvania
- Parkway Central High School, Chesterfield, Missouri
- Parkway North High School, Creve Coeur, Missouri
- Parkway South High School, Manchester, Missouri
- Parkway West High School (disambiguation)
