= E. Franklin Frazier =

American sociologist and writer (1894–1962)

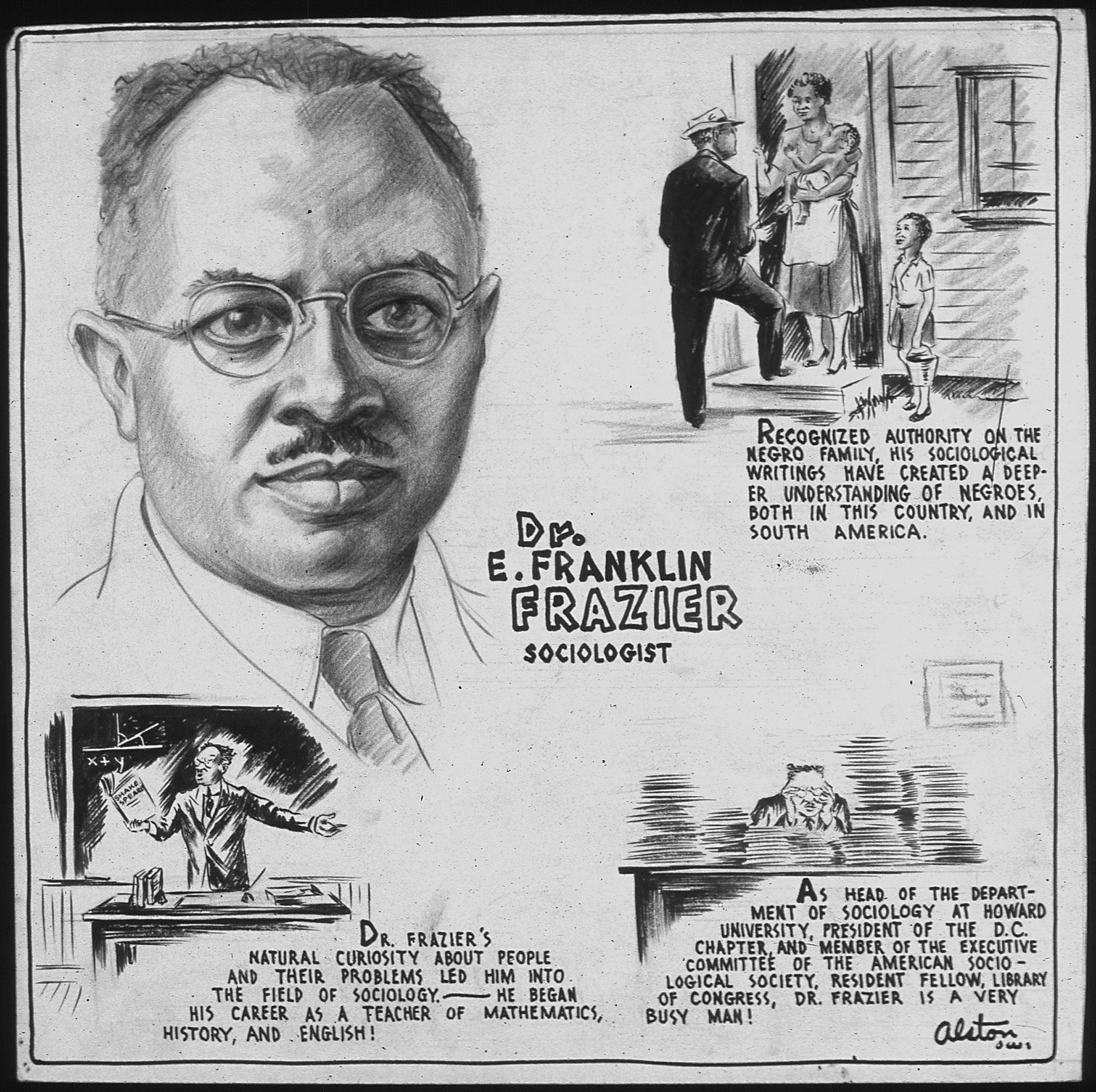
Poster from Office of War Information. Domestic Operations Branch. News Bureau, 1943

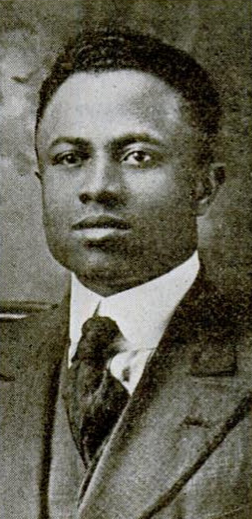
Frazier in 1922

Edward Franklin Frazier (/ˈfreɪʒər/; September 24, 1894 – May 17, 1962), was an American sociologist and author, publishing as E. Franklin Frazier. His 1932 Ph.D. dissertation was published as a book titled The Negro Family in the United States (1939); it analyzed the historical forces that influenced the development of the African-American family from the time of slavery to the mid-1930s. The book was awarded the 1940 Anisfield-Wolf Book Award for the most significant work in the field of race relations. It was among the first sociological works on Black people researched and written by a black person.

In 1948 Frazier was elected as the first black president of the American Sociological Association. He published numerous other books and articles on African-American culture and race relations. In 1950 Frazier helped draft the UNESCO statement The Race Question.

Frazier wrote a dozen books in his lifetime, including The Black Bourgeoisie, a critique of the black middle class in which he questioned the effectiveness of African-American businesses to produce racial equality.

== Biography ==
Frazier was born in Baltimore in 1894 as one of five children of James H. Frazier, a bank messenger, and Mary (Clark) Frazier, a homemaker. He attended the Baltimore public schools, which were legally segregated in those decades. Upon his graduation in 1912 from the Colored High and Training School in Baltimore (renamed in 1923 as Frederick Douglass High School), Frazier was awarded the school's annual scholarship to Howard University, a prominent historically black college.

He graduated with honors from Howard in 1916. Frazier was a top scholar, pursuing Latin, Greek, German and mathematics. He also participated in extracurricular activities including drama, political science, the National Association for the Advancement of Colored People (NAACP), and the Intercollegiate Socialist Society. He was elected as class president in both 1915 and 1916.

Following graduation from Howard, Frazier attended Clark University in Worcester, Massachusetts, where he earned a master's degree in 1920. The topic of his thesis was New Currents of Thought Among the Colored People of America. During his time at Clark, Frazier first began to study sociology, combining his approach with his deep interest in African-American history and culture. Frazier spent 1920–1921 as a Russell Sage Foundation fellow at the New York School of Social Work (later part of Columbia University).

Frazier taught sociology at Morehouse College, a historically black institution in Atlanta, where he established what is known in the 21st century as the Atlanta University School of Social Work. In 1927 Frazier published his article titled "The Pathology of Race Prejudice" in Forum. Using Freudian terms, he wrote that prejudice was "abnormal behavior," characteristic of "insanity," including dissociation, delusional thinking, rationalization, projection, and paranoia. White people in the South, he argued, were literally driven mad by the "Negro-complex," to the point that "men and women who are otherwise kind and law-abiding will indulge in the most revolting forms of cruelty towards black people."

An Atlanta paper carried an editorial against Frazier's work, which indirectly publicized his article. Already planning to move to Chicago, Frazier and his family left Atlanta early because of severe threats made against them due to the controversy and hostility among whites generated by his article. He had a fellowship from the University of Chicago's sociology department. His studies at Chicago culminated in his earning a Ph.D. in 1931.

Frazier was also teaching at Fisk University during this period, from 1929 to 1934. That year he returned to Howard University, where he taught from 1934 until his death in 1962. In 1944 he was granted a Rosenwald Fellowship to analyze post-1939 family data and study interracial marriages in New York. After founding and leading the D.C. chapter of the American Sociological Association, Frazier was elected as its first black president in 1948. At Howard, Frazier was a prominent member of the Howard School of International Relations, where his scholarship and research augmented Race and Empire in International Affairs. He was one of dozens of sociologists, psychologists and other social scientists who helped draft and sign the article, The Effects of Segregation and the Consequences of Desegregation: A Social Science Statement, published in 1953 and entered as a major piece of evidence in the Brown vs Board of Education Supreme Court case.

In his research and writing, Frazier adopted an approach that examined economic, political and attitudinal factors that shape the systems of social relationships. He continually pressed to find the "social reality" in any context he investigated. His stature was recognized by his election in 1948 as the first black president of the American Sociological Association. "He was established as the leading American scholar on the black family and was also recognized as a leading theorist on the dynamics of social change and race relations."

Frazier's position emphasized African-American cultural developments as a process of accommodation to new conditions in the Americas. Frazier's Black Bourgeoisie, the 1957 English translation of a work first published in French in 1955, was a critical examination of the adoption by middle-class African Americans of a subservient conservatism. His book received "mixed reviews and harsh criticism from the black middle and professional class. Yet Frazier stood solidly by his argument that the black middle class was marked by conspicuous consumption, wish fulfillment, and a world of make-believe."

Frazier's Race and Culture Contacts in the Modern World, published in 1957, explored the relations between the European and non-European races along four categories: ecological, economic, political, and social. The study argued that the economic expansion of Europe remained the most important factor underlying race relations. Likewise, it argued that the new regional power structure birthed out of the Cold War gave non-white peoples an increasingly important role in international affairs with the UN also acting as an arena for the struggles emergent in race relations.

Frazier published eight books, 89 articles and 18 chapters in books edited by others.

Frazier died on May 17, 1962, age 67, in Washington, D.C. He has been ranked among the most important African Americans for his influence on institutions and practices to accept the demands by African Americans for economic, political and social equality in American life.

Some of Frazier's writings generated controversy in the black community for their focus on the effects of slavery and how it divided the black family. During the McCarthy era, when there was conservative political pressure against liberals, Frazier supported civil rights for African Americans; he was also a member of the Council on African Affairs.

== Legacy and honors ==
- Howard University named its E. Franklin Frazier Center for Social Work Research after him.
- Clark University created a chair and professorship in his name: The E. Franklin Frazier Chair and Professor of English.

== Published works ==
- The Free Negro Family: a Study of Family Origins Before the Civil War (Nashville: Fisk University Press, 1932)
- The Negro Family in Chicago (Chicago: University of Chicago Press, 1932)
- The Negro Family in the United States (Chicago: University of Chicago Press, 1939)
- Negro Youth at the Crossways: Their Personality Development in the Middle States (Washington, D.C.: American Council on Education, 1940)
- The Negro Family in Bahia, Brazil (1942)
- The Negro in the United States (New York: Macmillan, 1949)
- The Integration of the Negro into American Society (editor) (Washington, D.C.: Howard University Press, 1951.
- Bourgeoisie noire (Paris: Plon, 1955)
- Black Bourgeoisie (translation of Bourgeoisie noire)(Glencoe, IL: Free Press, 1957)
- Race and Culture Contacts in the Modern World (New York: Knopf, 1957)
- The Negro Church in America (New York: Schocken Books, 1963)
- On Race Relations: Selected Writings, edited and with an introduction by G. Franklin Edwards, (Chicago: University of Chicago Press, 1968)
