= Parkway Village =

Parkway Village may refer to:

- Parkway Village, Kentucky
- Parkway Village, New Jersey
- Parkway Village (Queens), New York City
- Parkway Village, Memphis, Tennessee
- Parkway Villages, Houston, Texas
