= Jo Elizabeth Bryant =

American politician

Member of the Kentucky House of Representatives from the 82nd district
- In office January 1, 1991 – January 1, 1995
- Preceded by: Charlie Siler
- Succeeded by: Charlie Siler

Personal details
- Party: Republican

Jo Elizabeth Bryant (born 1937) is an American politician from Kentucky who was a member of the Kentucky House of Representatives from 1991 to 1995. Bryant was first elected in 1990 after defeating incumbent representative Charlie Siler in the May primary election. She did not seek reelection in 1994.
