= Parkway Village, Kentucky =

- City
- Location of Parkway Village in Jefferson County, Kentucky

- Location within the state of Kentucky Parkway Village (the United States)
- Coordinates: 38°12′41″N 85°44′17″W
- Country: United States
- State: Kentucky
- County: Jefferson
- Incorporated: 1940
- Named for: Eastern Parkway

Area
  - Total: 0.089 sq mi (0.23 km^{2})
  - Land: 0.089 sq mi (0.23 km^{2})
  - Water: 0 sq mi (0.00 km^{2})
- Elevation: 495 ft (151 m)

Population (2020)
  - Total: 623
  - Density: 7,109.2/sq mi (2,744.89/km^{2})
- Time zone: UTC-5 (Eastern (EST))
  - Summer (DST): UTC-4 (EDT)
- ZIP Code: 40217
- FIPS code: 21-59322
- GNIS feature ID: 2404483
- Website: www.parkwayvillageky.com

Parkway Village is a home rule-class city in Jefferson County, Kentucky, United States, and a part of the Louisville Metro government. It was developed in the 1920s and incorporated in 1941. As of the 2020 census, Parkway Village had a population of 623.

== Geography ==
Parkway Village is located in west-central Jefferson County directly south of downtown Louisville. Kentucky Route 61 (Preston Highway) forms the western boundary of the community. According to the United States Census Bureau, Parkway Village has a total area of 0.09 square miles (0.23 km^{2}), all land.

== Demographics ==
Historical population
| Census | Pop. | Note | %± |
|---|---|---|---|
| 1950 | 1,036 | | — |
| 1960 | 949 | | −8.4% |
| 1970 | 829 | | −12.6% |
| 1980 | 754 | | −9.0% |
| 1990 | 707 | | −6.2% |
| 2000 | 715 | | 1.1% |
| 2010 | 650 | | −9.1% |
| 2020 | 623 | | −4.2% |
U.S. Decennial Census

As of the census of 2000, there were 715 people, 299 households, and 186 families residing in the city. The population density was 8,642.9 inhabitants per square mile (3,337.0/km^{2}). There were 313 housing units at an average density of 3,783.5 units per square mile (1,460.8 units/km^{2}). The racial makeup of the city was 94.83% White, 3.22% African American, 0.14% Native American, 0.14% Asian, 1.26% from other races, and 0.42% from two or more races. Hispanic or Latino of any race were 2.24% of the population.

There were 299 households, out of which 26.8% had children under the age of 18 living with them, 48.5% were married couples living together, 10.4% had a female householder with no husband present, and 37.5% were non-families. 29.1% of all households were made up of individuals, and 13.4% had someone living alone who was 65 years of age or older. The average household size was 2.39 and the average family size was 2.94.

In the city, the population was spread out, with 19.2% under the age of 18, 10.5% from 18 to 24, 33.3% from 25 to 44, 21.4% from 45 to 64, and 15.7% who were 65 years of age or older. The median age was 38 years. For every 100 females, there were 99.7 males. For every 100 females age 18 and over, there were 100.0 males.

The median income for a household in the city was $43,393, and the median income for a family was $52,639. Males had a median income of $34,405 versus $26,538 for females. The per capita income for the city was $21,696. About 5.9% of families and 8.8% of the population were below the poverty line, including 7.1% of those under age 18 and 9.0% of those age 65 or over.

== See also ==
- Other places named Parkway Village
