= Howard School of International Relations =

Former part of Howard University

- The Howard School of International Relations
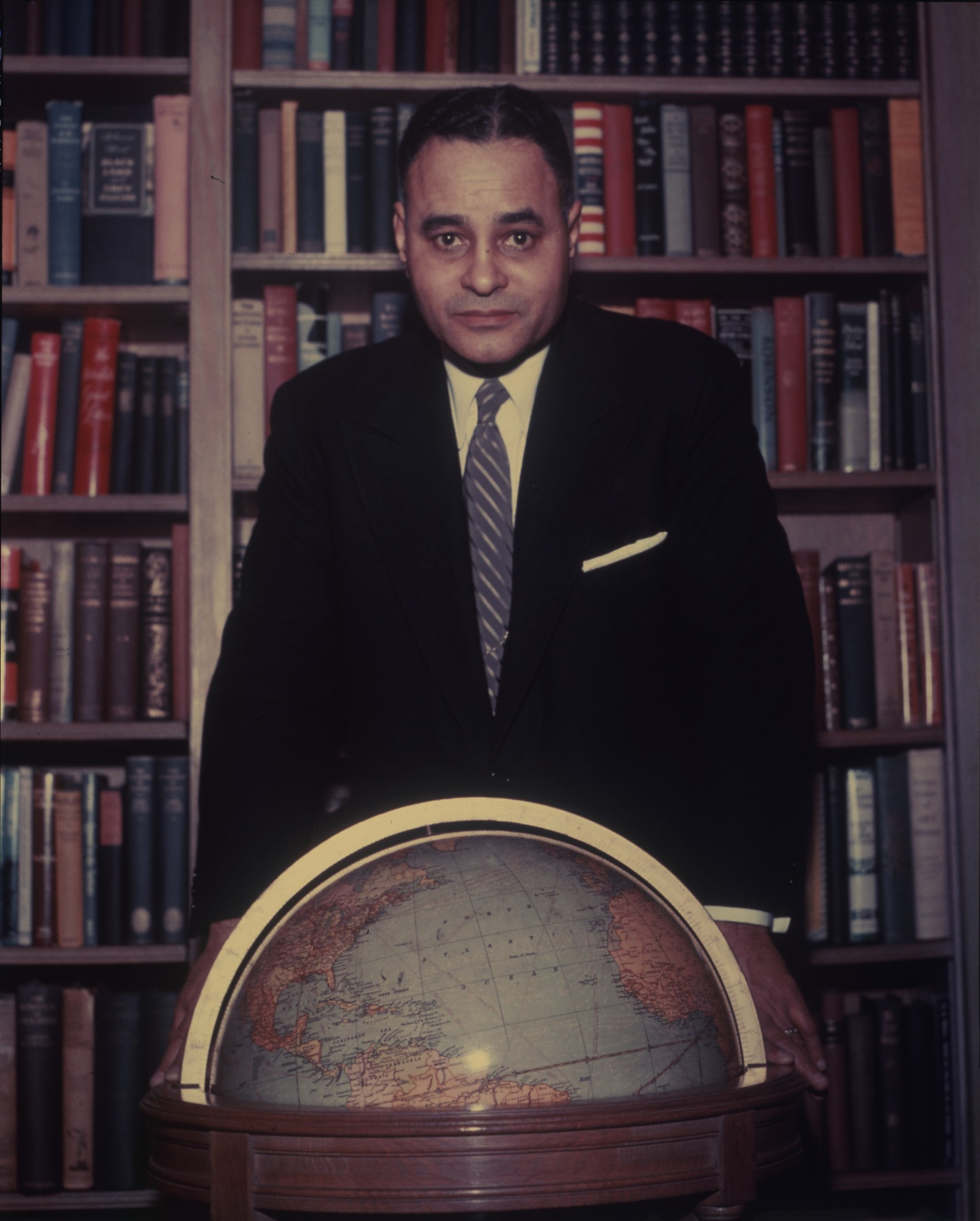
- Ralph Bunche, chair of the Department of Political Science (1928–1950)
- Named after: Howard University, the institution at which its most notable scholars taught, studied, and researched.
- Formation: 1920s
- Founded at: Howard University
- Dissolved: Early 1960s
- Key people: Ralph Bunche, Merze Tate, Eric Williams, E. Franklin Frazier, Alain Locke, Dorothy Porter, Rayford Logan

The Howard School of International Relations is a school of academic thought originating at Howard University in the decades between the 1920s and 1950s. Articulated by scholars such as Merze Tate, Ralph Bunche, Alain Locke, E. Franklin Frazier, Rayford Logan, and Eric Williams, the Howard School emphasized race and empire in the study of international relations. These scholars posed a sustained critique of dominant international relations theories such as racial hierarchy, which vindicated the Jim Crow era in the U.S. as well as the practice of colonialism in the world through the 1960s.

== Contributions to theory ==
=== Race in international relations ===
"'Backward' Peoples Under the Mandate System" by Raymond Leslie Buell demonstrated the prevailing attitude towards racial hierarchy by white scholars at the time. In this article, Buell justified the League of Nations' mandate system, which functioned as a racial hierarchy with European countries along with Japan and South Africa, controlling various parts of Africa and Asia. Actions made by the mandate powers functioned to erase native culture with legislation forbidding native rituals and by extending a hand to Christian missionaries. This system also enabled the extraction of resources from the mandated territories for the enrichment of the mandate powers. Buell goes on to state that white people grew more kind to colored people, as seen by the ending of slavery, and hoped that the "colored problem" could be resolved by a treaty of the mandate powers. This view of race in international relations as a "problem" which could be resolved through racial hierarchy was directly challenged by members of the Howard School with calls for decolonization, self-determination and human rights.

For example, Ralph Bunche's PhD Dissertation "French Administration in Togoland and Dahomey", after visiting Togo and developing an understanding of the colonial experience undergone by the native people, adopted a different perspective. Bunche advocated for providing education that was motivated by an intent to understand and promote native culture. Furthermore, he advocated for education which would help the colonized people gain independence instead of education which would make them more easily exploitable by colonizers.

The Howard School scholars saw race was a factor in international relations that should be recognized, studied and understood.

=== Hierarchy in international relations ===
A key topic addressed by members of the Howard School of International Relations was that of decolonization. This is the process by which colonial rulers relinquish control of their colonies. The Howard School scholars produced analyses that connected race and colonialism. They demonstrated not only how the system of colonization perpetuated itself, but also how the system could be changed. For example, Ralph Bunche proposed changes to the Mandate system in his 1934 PhD dissertation, and worked to replace the Mandate system when he joined the new United Nations Secretariat as head of the Trusteeship Department in 1946. Rayford Logan was another key contributor to this topic and wrote "The African Mandates in World Politics." He also did research on the effects of colonialism in Haiti and the Dominican Republic.

Race hierarchy consists of the application of race relations and principles of hierarchy to explicate the display of power politics in the contexts of colonialism, imperialism, and institutionalized oppression, generally in opposition to black populations. In an effort to contextualize imperialism in the frame of race hierarchy, Ralph Bunche, head of Howard University's Political Science Department from 1928 to 1942, expressed his understanding of the attitudes held by European officials and African peoples in his book, A World View on Race. Bunche stated that imperialist agendas cast the unsupported image that there existed "backward" people, perpetually incapable of progress and "advanced" people, who continually guided the world into the modern, industrial age. Bunche argued that the "white man's burden" to which European imperialist aims were attributed masked the real intentions of these countries that sought only to acquire resources found on the African continent. Bunche offered a deconstruction of the biological positioning of race put forth by Earnest Hooton by identifying phenotypical inconsistencies in race classification. Bunche asserted that race serves industrial states in ascribing to their "economic and political policy."

== Notable scholars ==
Below is a list of notable scholars of the Howard School of International Affairs and their key contributions to the school of academic thought.

=== Alain Locke ===
Alain Locke, an American philosopher, theorist of the Harlem Renaissance, and the first black Rhodes Scholar, began teaching at Howard in 1912 as an assistant professor in the English Department. After receiving his PhD in Philosophy from Harvard University, Locke returned to Howard as chair of the Department of Philosophy, where he taught philosophy and English. Dismissed from Howard in 1925 for advocating equal pay for African American and white staff in the school, he was reappointed by Mordecai Johnson, who became the first African American president of Howard in June 1926. Locke taught until his retirement in 1953.

At Howard, Locke's scholarship conceptualized race beyond the biological and hereditary by emphasizing cultural and social elements. This view, along with his philosophy about value systems, is visible in his involvement with the Harlem Renaissance, which he labeled the New Negro movement. In this new movement, Locke gave voice to a Black America beyond "the Negro Problem." He sought to elevate the arts, literature, and music of this "Black mecca" in the U.S., which he herald as new era of change. In this way, Locke's scholarship elevated Black life and aesthetics in the U.S. and around the world.

Additionally, Alain Locke, educated in Germany and England, had a significant international orientation and influence. Locke viewed race as a primary motivator in imperial and colonial endeavors that were pushed by commercial and religious agendas. This was a direct challenge to the privileging of Empire within International Relations discipline.

=== E. Franklin Frazier ===
E. Franklin Frazier, an American sociologist and author, was an expert on the African American family. Frazier attended Howard University and graduated with honors in 1916. Afterwards, he began teaching mathematics at Tuskegee University from 1916–1917, English and History at St. Paul's Normal and Industrial School from 1917 to 1918, and French and Mathematics at Baltimore High School from 1918–1919. In 1920, Frazier earned a master's degree from Clark University in Worcester, Massachusetts. His thesis was entitled, "New Currents of Thought Among the Colored People of America," and explored sociology in depth.

Frazier was a Russell Sage Foundation fellow at the New York School of Social Work, now known as Columbia University School of Social Work, from 1920 to 1921. He continued his education at the University of Copenhagen where he was awarded an American Scandinavian Foundation fellowship. Afterwards, Frazer became director of the Atlanta School of Social Work at Atlanta University and worked as a lecturer of Sociology at Morehouse College. In his five-year tenure as director, Frazier made contributions as an administrator, theorist, and activist against racism. However, he had to leave the school shortly after publishing several articles pronouncing racism as similar to insanity.

Frazier received a fellowship at the University of Chicago's Sociology department and culminated his time there by earning a PhD in 1931. Then, Frazier taught at Fisk University, another Historically Black College University, before moving to Howard University. Frazier taught at Howard from 1934 until his death in 1962. At Howard, his research covered the Black family in the U.S., race, and culture in the modern world. His scholarship addressed the role of race in social, economic, and political conditions of the world.

=== Ralph Bunche ===
Ralph Bunche, an American political scientist and diplomat, received his MA in political science in 1928 and PhD in 1934 from Harvard University. He was appointed an instructor in political science at Howard University, and rose to become professor and chair of the department. From 1936 to 1938, Bunche studied anthropology and conducted postdoctoral research at Northwestern University and the London School of Economics (LSE). During this time, Bunche developed an expertise on the impact of colonialism on colonial subjects. His book, A Worldview of Race, argues that race plays a role in modern economic, political, and social conditions. When the US entered World War II, Bunche took a leave of absence from Howard University in 1941 and did not return to formal teaching. He worked as Senior Social Science Analyst for Africa in the Office of Strategic Services (OSS), then at the U.S. State Department, and finally, at the United Nations. In this way, Ralph Bunche was both a practitioner of international relations and a scholar. Turning theory to practice, he expanded the reach of the Howard School of International Relations academic thought by attempting to displace racial hierarchy in domestic and international institutions.

=== Rayford Logan ===
Rayford Logan, an American historian, taught at Howard from 1938 to 1965. As a young activist, he sought many ways to improve the plight of African-Americans in the United States, particularly helping black people with voter registration. During World War II, he helped advocate for African-Americans to be included in the defense industries and combat units of the S. military. With a PhD from Harvard, he published his dissertation as his first book, The Diplomatic Relations of the United States with Haiti-1776-1891. He continued to publish scholarly articles and books based on his research into African, Caribbean and African American history. He was close to W.E DuBois and Carter G. Woodson and was actively involved with the Association for the Study of Negro Life and History throughout his career. With the establishment of the United Nations in 1945, Rayford Logan served as chief advisor to the NAACP on international affairs, particularly in matters concerning the UN Trusteeship system. In the aftermath of World War II, Italy pressed for reclamation of its former colonies as a reward for joining the Allies following the fall of Mussolini. The NAACP, led by Logan, promoted "the wishes of the inhabitants" in opposition to Italy's desire to reinstate its control over Eritrea, Somalia, and Libya.

=== Eric Williams ===
Eric Williams, an economic historian, taught political and social sciences at Howard from 1938 to 1955, where he participated in numerous discussions about race, empire and the role of white supremacy in the organization of the world. After returning home to Trinidad and Tobago, Eric Williams entered politics. In his best known book, Capitalism and Slavery (1944), developed multiple theories regarding the relationships between slavery, abolition, racism, and British capitalism. The work features four key conclusions drawn from Williams' research on British capitalism and Caribbean slavery. The phenomenon of racism, according to Williams, emerged in the aftermath of economic exploitation of black slaves, therefore making the phenomenon a consequence – not the cause – of slavery. Williams also addressed the growth of Britain's fiscal apparatus, attributing much of the empire's industrialization to revenue garnered from its slave trade. For his third and fourth points, Williams contested the notion that British humanitarianism led to slavery's decline in the Caribbean and asserted that the true factor was the declining economies of the British West Indies during the period following the American Revolutionary War. These contributions solidified Williams' position as a widely acclaimed scholar in The Howard School of International Relations.

=== Merze Tate ===
Merze Tate, an American scholar, world traveler and expert in U.S. diplomacy began teaching at Howard in 1942. She was a 1950–1951 Fulbright Scholar in India, and she traveled to a number of countries in Asia as a U.S. Information agency lecturer. Before joining Howard faculty, Tate taught at Bennett College in Greensboro, North Carolina and Morehouse College in Atlanta, Georgia – two historically black liberal arts colleges. She became the first black woman in the History Department at Howard University and was a Professor in Diplomatic History at Howard for 35 years. She was a prolific writer. Most of her published works showed a broad interest in human development. Notable was The United States and the Hawaiian Kingdom: A Political History (1965) – was her study on Kamehameha IV. Other books include The Disarmament Illusion: The Movement for a Limitation of Armaments to 1907 (1942), The United States and Armaments (1948), and Hawaii: Reciprocity or Annexation. In the 1980s she began a project on Mineral Railways in Africa and published Mineral Railways in Africa in 1989. Tate also researched imperialism in Asia, which was connected with imperialism in America at the time.
