= Ralph Bunche House (Washington, D.C.) =

Historic house in Washington, D.C., United States

- U.S. National Register of Historic Places
- D.C. Inventory of Historic Sites
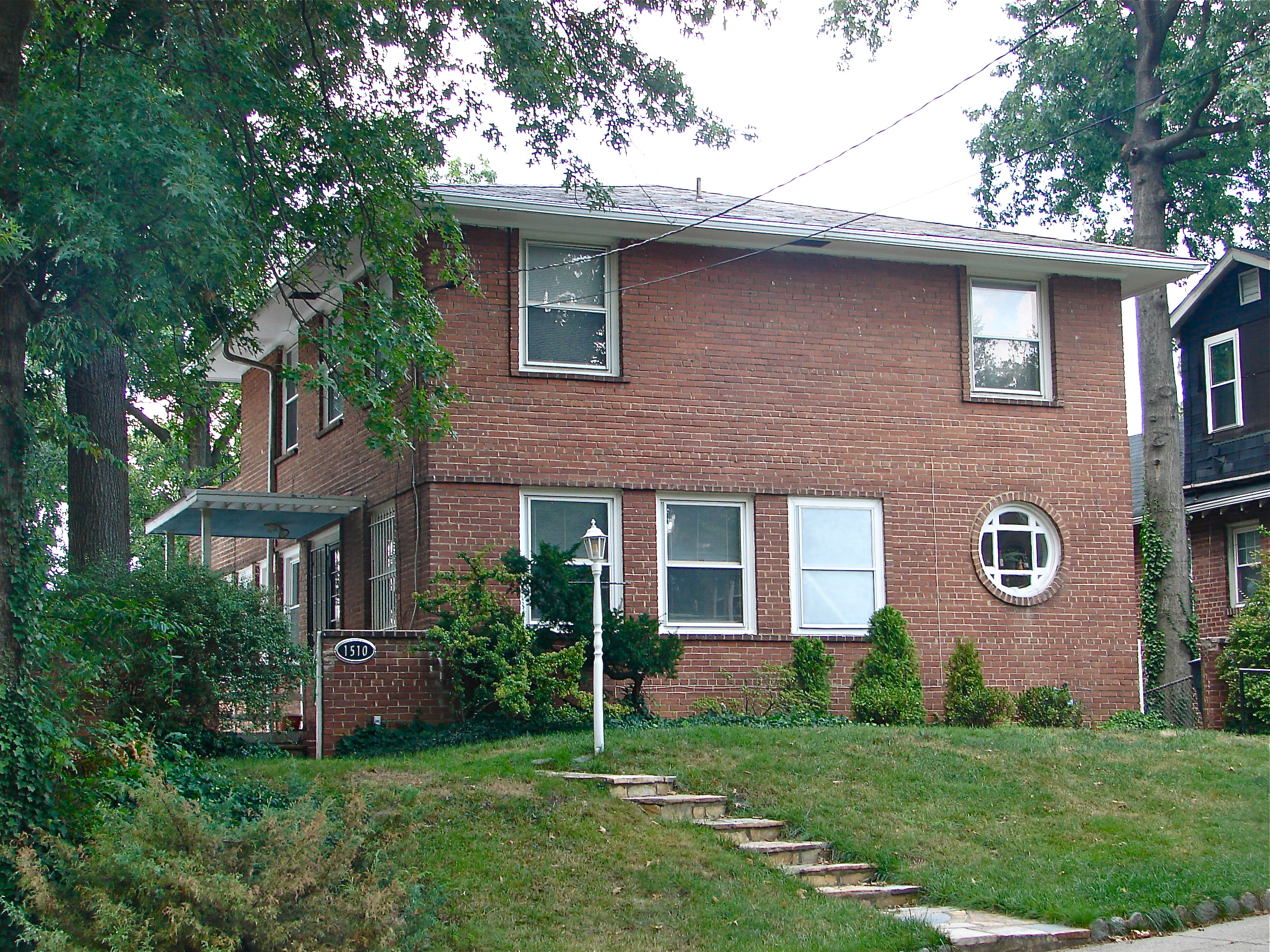
- Ralph Bunche House in 2011

- Location within District of Columbia Location within the United States
- Location: 1510 Jackson Street, N.E., Washington, D.C.
- Coordinates: 38°55′47″N 76°59′2″W
- Area: less than one acre
- Built: 1941
- Architect: Hilyard Robinson
- Architectural style: International style
- NRHP reference No.: 93001013

Significant dates
- Added to NRHP: September 30, 1993
- Designated DCIHS: April 29, 1975

Ralph Bunche House was the home Ralph Bunche commissioned from Hilyard Robinson in 1941. It is located at 1510 Jackson Street, Northeast, Washington, D.C., United States, in the Brookland neighborhood.

He lived there while he was a professor at Howard University, and worked at the Office of Strategic Services (1941-1943) and the State Department (1943-1947).

It was listed in the National Register of Historic Places in 1993. It was named as an endangered place by the D.C. Preservation League in 2001.

== See also ==
- National Register of Historic Places listings in Washington, D.C.
- Ralph J. Bunche House, his home in Los Angeles, California
- Ralph Johnson Bunche House, the home in Queens, New York, where Bunche lived for 30 years until his death in 1971.
