= Wild Bunch (disambiguation) =

The Wild Bunch was a gang of outlaws (also known as the Doolin–Dalton Gang or the Oklahombres), based in Indian Territory, that terrorized Arkansas, Kansas, Missouri, and Oklahoma Territory during the 1890s, committing robberies and holdups, and killing lawmen.

The Wild Bunch is a 1969 western film about an aging group of outlaws

Wild Bunch or The Wild Bunch may also refer to:

== People ==
- Butch Cassidy's Wild Bunch, an outlaw gang that operated out of Hole-in-the-Wall, Wyoming, 1899–1901
- Tiësto (born 1969), Dutch DJ also known as Wild Bunch

== Arts, entertainment, and media ==
=== Fictional entities ===
- The Wild Bunch, a group of computer scientists in the anime Digimon Tamers
- The Wild Bunch, a fictional gang of outlaws 150 members strong, in the Western film My Name is Nobody (1973)
- Anslo Garrick and his gang of mercenaries, self-proclaimed "The Wild Bunch" in The Blacklist season 1, episode 9

=== Music ===
- The Wild Bunch (sound system), a 1980s sound system group based in Bristol, England
- "The Wild Bunch", a song by Fireworks from their 2011 album Gospel
- The Wildbunch, another name for the Detroit-based band Electric Six

=== Other uses in arts, entertainment, and media ===
- The Wild Bunch (video game), a 1985 computer game
- The Wild Bunch (1942), a novel by Ernest Haycox
- The Wild Bunch, the eight mascots of the restaurant, Rainforest Cafe
- The Wild Bunch: An Album in Montage (1996), a documentary film television series
- "The Wild Bunch" (Due South), a 1995 television episode

== Other uses ==
- Wild Bunch (company), a German film distributor, production company, and formerly an international sales company
