= Parkway Village (Queens) =

- U.S. National Register of Historic Places
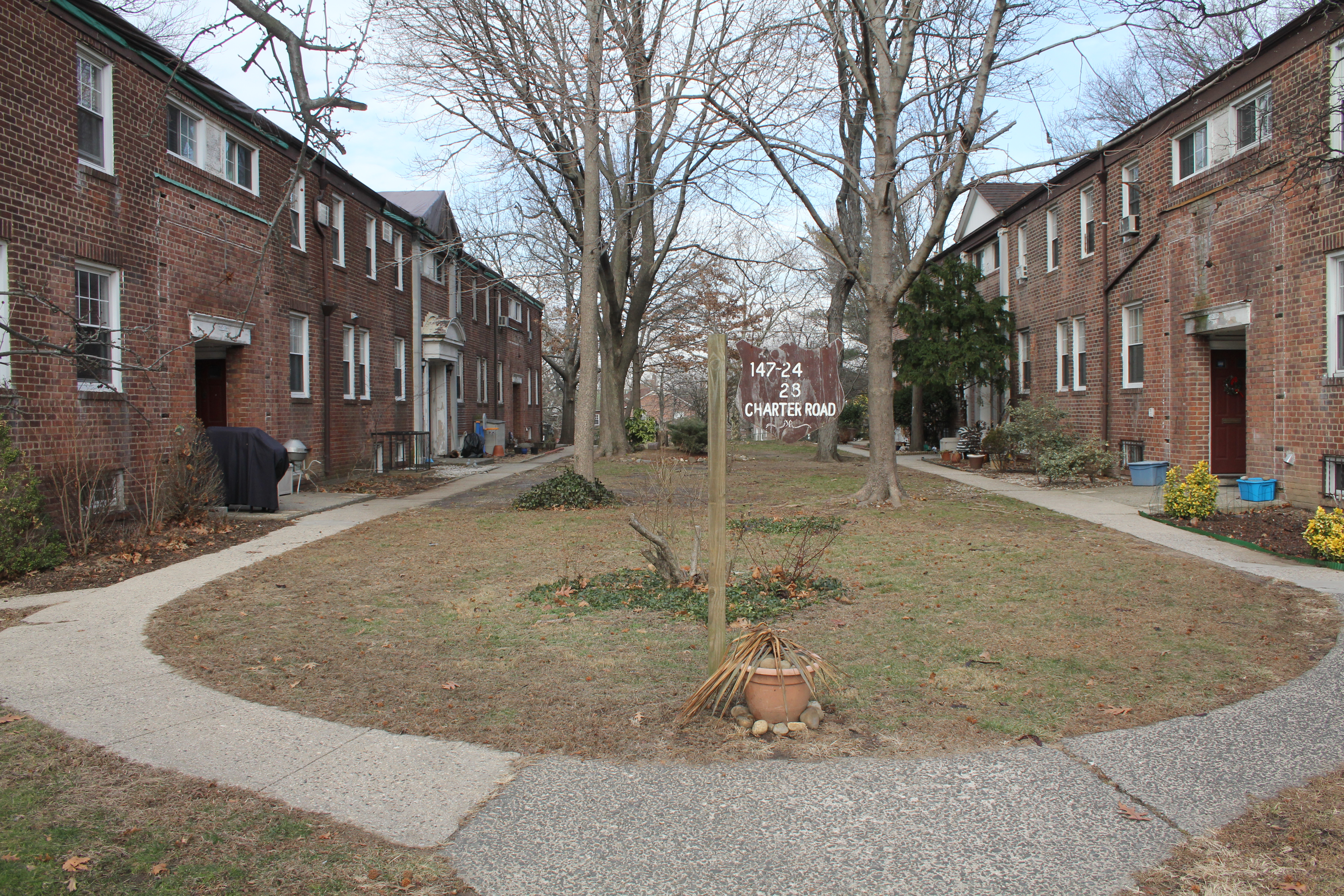
- Two buildings enclosing a landscaped court

- Location within New York City Location within New York Location within the United States
- Location: Bounded by Union Tpke., 150th St., Goethals Ave., Parsons Blvd., Grand Central Parkway, & Main St. in Kew Gardens Hills, Queens, New York City
- Coordinates: 40°43′02″N 73°48′46″W
- Area: 35 acres (14 ha)
- Built: 1947
- Architect: Leonard Schultze and Associates; landscape by Clarence Combs
- Architectural style: Neo-Georgian, "modernized Colonial"
- NRHP reference No.: 12000052
- Added to NRHP: February 28, 2012

Parkway Village is a garden apartment complex with 675 residential units, located on 35 acres (14 ha) in the Briarwood section of Queens in New York City. It was completed in 1947 to house United Nations employees and delegates, many of whom had faced racial discrimination when they sought housing in other areas.

== History ==
When the United Nations began operations in the New York City area in 1946, people from all over the world came to the area to work for the fledgling international organization, including many persons of color. Almost all real estate in the area was racially segregated, and this along with a national housing shortage made housing options for non-white people particularly limited. In an attempt to surmount this shortage, the UN had contracted for housing in Fresh Meadows and Peter Cooper Village, both new apartment complexes owned by the Metropolitan Life Insurance Company, but these contracts still allowed the company to deny housing to prospective residents on the basis of race. Although it had not articulated a discriminatory policy, in fact both complexes' residents were exclusively white at the time (and for decades thereafter). Many UN employees protested this situation, and the UN backed out of its contracts with the complexes. Still needing housing near the UN building for its employees, the organization then signed a lease with Parkway Village, which was under construction at the time.

As the initial lessee of most of the apartments, the UN could allocate housing to its employees without regard to race or origin. This made Parkway Village an unusually integrated community for its time. The location was convenient to the UN's temporary headquarters, the present Queens Museum building erected for the 1939 New York World's Fair, where many thought the organization would build its permanent headquarters, which ultimately was completed in 1952 in Manhattan. Though the UN's involvement in the property ended the same year that the Manhattan headquarters opened, many of its employees continued to live there, and they comprised about a quarter of all residents three decades later.

Ralph Bunche, an African American diplomat who was instrumental in the UN's formation, and who won the Nobel Peace Prize in 1950, lived at Parkway Village from 1947 to 1952. Bunche was one of the employees who protested the UN's initial involvement with segregated apartment complexes. After leaving Parkway Village, Bunche moved to a private house nearby that is a National Historic Site. Around this time, two prominent residents without UN connections were attracted to the community by its unique international character: civil rights leader Roy Wilkins and labor (and later feminist) activist Betty Friedan both lived at Parkway Village in the early 1950s.

== Architecture ==
The complex consists of 109 buildings, which together occupy 16% of the land, surrounded by landscaped grounds. Each are two or three stories tall and are faced with red brick. Their style is described as neo-Georgian or "modernized Colonial". The architect was Leonard Schultze, who in prior decades was known for designing luxury hotels (notably the Waldorf Astoria New York), but who in the 1940s had turned his attention to large middle-income apartment complexes for the Metropolitan Life Insurance Company, including Parkmerced in San Francisco, Park La Brea in Los Angeles, and Parkfairfax in Alexandria, Virginia.

The landscape designer was Clarence Combs (1892-1958), who had previously worked on many other projects associated with Robert Moses, including the well-known Jones Beach State Park. Moses, a politically powerful parks commissioner and the driving force behind the construction of Parkway Village, had helped to arrange the project's financing and lease with the UN. He likely recommended Combs for the landscaping role.

Owing to both its architectural significance and its historical associations, the complex was listed on the National Register of Historic Places in 2012.
