= Arthur Bunch =

South African soccer player

Personal information
- Full name: Arthur William Bunch
- Date of birth: 30 September 1909
- Place of birth: Bloemfontein, South Africa
- Date of death: 1973 (aged 63–64)
- Position: Inside right

Senior career*
Years	Team	Apps	(Gls)
- Wellington Works
- Aldershot
- Blyth Spartans
1934	Aldershot	16	(3)
- Blyth Spartans
- * Club domestic league appearances and goals

Arthur William Bunch (30 September 1909 – 1973) was a football player who played as an inside right for Aldershot in the Football League. He also played for Wellington Works and Blyth Spartans.
