= Josephine Bunch =

British physicist

Josephine Bunch CBE
- Education: Sheffield Hallam University
- Scientific career
- Workplaces: National Physical Laboratory (United Kingdom) Imperial College London University of Sheffield
- Thesis: Detection and imaging of pharmaceutical compounds in skin by MALDI-MS (2005)

Josephine Bunch CBE is a fellow at the National Physical Laboratory. She is Chair of Biomolecular Mass Spectrometry at Imperial College London and the co-director of the National Centre of Excellence in Mass Spectrometry Imaging.

== Education ==
Bunch completed a PhD sponsored by Pfizer at Sheffield Hallam University in 2005. Her thesis, "Detection and imaging of pharmaceutical compounds in skin by MALDI-MS", used mass spectrometry.

== Research ==
Bunch was a postdoctoral researcher at the University of Sheffield, where she was awarded an Enterprise Fellowship to commercialise imaging using mass spectrometry. She joined the University of Birmingham, leading a large multi-disciplinary group using MALDI Mass spectrometry. She remains an honorary senior research fellow at the University of Birmingham. She also holds a chair in Biomolecular Mass Spectrometry at Imperial College London.

She joined the National Physical Laboratory in 2013, where she became responsible for research in MALDI metrology. In 2017 Bunch was funded by Cancer Research UK's Grand Challenge to map tumours at a molecular and cellular level. She came up with the idea when listening to a BBC Radio 4 program about the Cancer Research UK Grand Challenges. The investment was worth £16 million, and uses mass spectrometry imaging techniques to study breast, bowel and pancreatic tumours in "unprecedented detail. She spoke about the project at the Hay Festival and presented their project at the Royal Society Summer Exhibition.

She is part of a COST (European Cooperation in Science and Technology) Action on mass spectrometry imaging.
