= Madeline Bunch =

American entrepreneur

Madeline Bunch is an American entrepreneur from Santa Rosa, California. In 1972, she and her family began the Bunch Products Company, manufacturing Old South Brand beef and pork sausages.
