= Alva, Kentucky =

Unincorporated community in Kentucky, United States

- Unincorporated community
- Location within Kentucky Location within the United States
- Coordinates: 36°44′06″N 83°25′28″W
- Country: United States
- State: Kentucky
- County: Harlan
- Elevation: 1,444 ft (440 m)
- Time zone: UTC-5 (Eastern (EST))
  - Summer (DST): UTC-4 (EDT)
- Area code: 606
- GNIS feature ID: 485915

Alva is an unincorporated community in Harlan County, Kentucky, United States. Alva is 6.5 miles (10.5 km) south of Wallins Creek.
