= Parkway West High School =

Parkway West High School may refer to:

- Parkway West High School (Missouri)
- Parkway West High School (Pennsylvania)
