= Parkway Newbury =

Shopping mall in Berkshire, England

- Location: Newbury, Berkshire, England
- Coordinates: 51°24′14.74″N 1°19′24.18″W
- Opened: 27 October 2011
- Developer: Standard Life Investments & Shearer Property Group
- Owner: Standard Life Investments
- Architect: Building Design Partnership
- Num. of stores: More than 50 shops and kiosks, and 184 apartments
- Num. of anchor tenants: 1 Marks and Spencer)
- Floor area: 475,000 sq ft (44,000 m^{2})
- Floors: 2
- Website: www.shopatparkway.com

Parkway Newbury is a retail and residential development in Newbury, Berkshire that opened on 27 October 2011. It includes 475,000 sq ft (44,000 m^{2}) of retail and restaurant accommodation and Marks & Spencer, 578 shopper car parking spaces, 113 residents parking spaces. The mixed-use scheme also consists of 147 luxury residential apartments and 37 affordable housing units being built above the shopping centre.

== History ==
Artist's impression of Parkway Newbury

The planning of the 5.7acre site began in 2004. The development began in March 2009 with the site being cleared of buildings. Before construction began, West Berkshire Council had to take several steps to compulsory purchase land for the development. In order for the centre to be joined to the existing streets, 35 and 36 Northbrook Street had to be knocked through.

== Retail ==
It is anchored by an extended Marks & Spencer department store. The shopping centre houses approximately 50 stores, cafes and restaurants.

As of November 2014, stores include Marks & Spencer, New Look, H&M, Monsoon Accessorize, Joules.

== Residential ==
Parkway Living is a development of 147 one, two and three bedroom apartments and penthouses. Options of views across Victoria Park, private terraces and balconies. Each apartment and penthouse comes with designated parking in the underground car park.

== Gallery ==
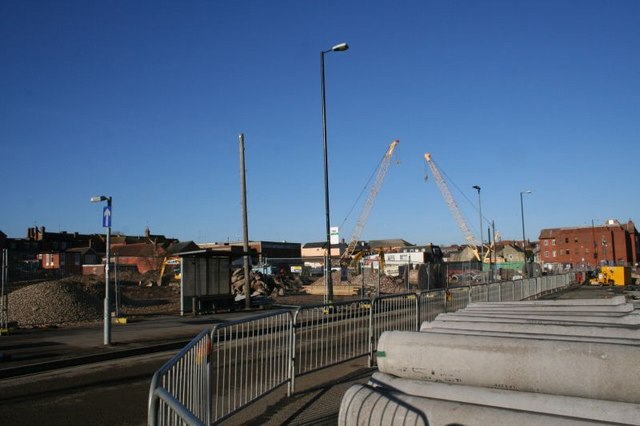
Construction in December 2008

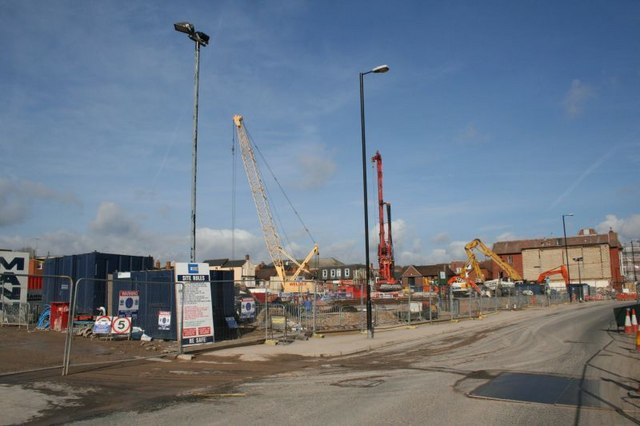
Construction in March 2009

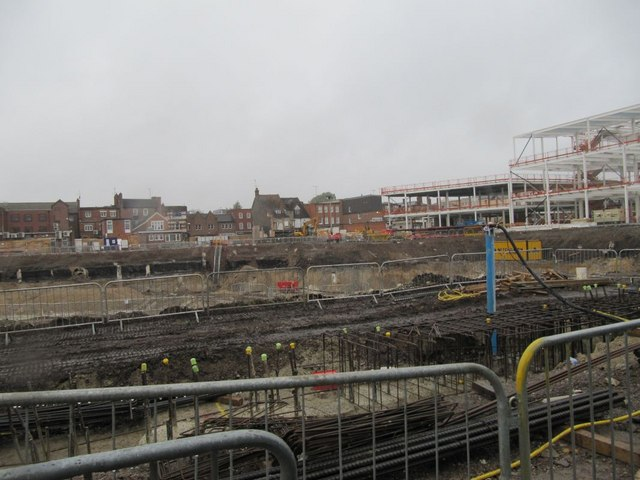
Construction in October 2009

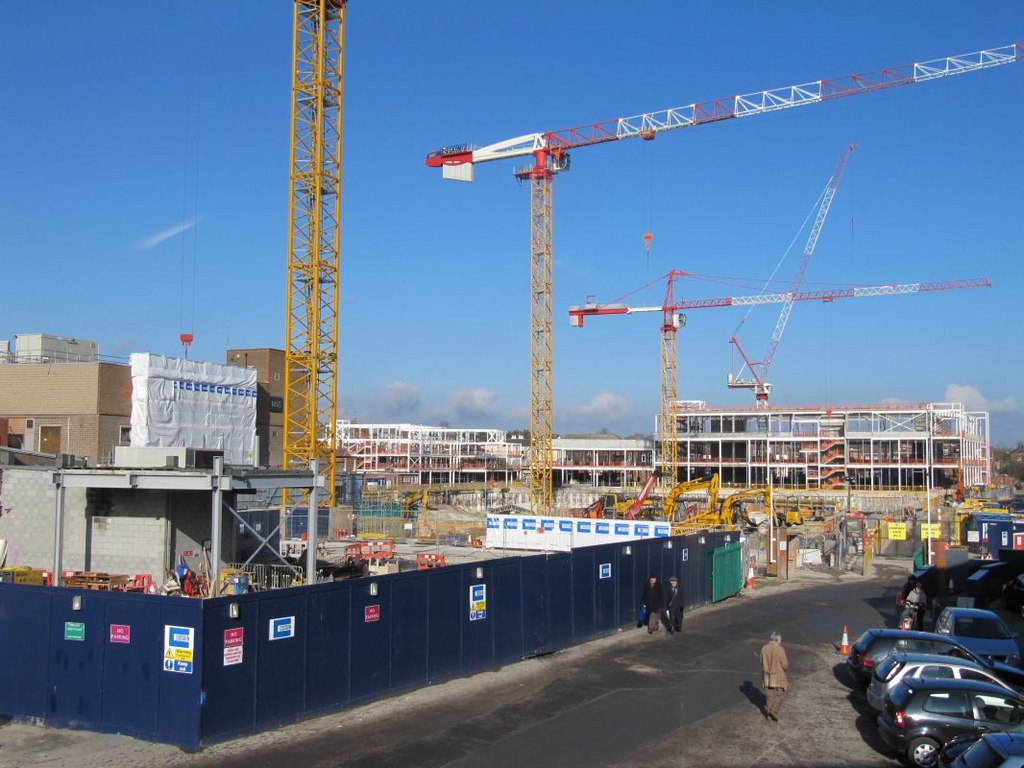
Construction in February 2010

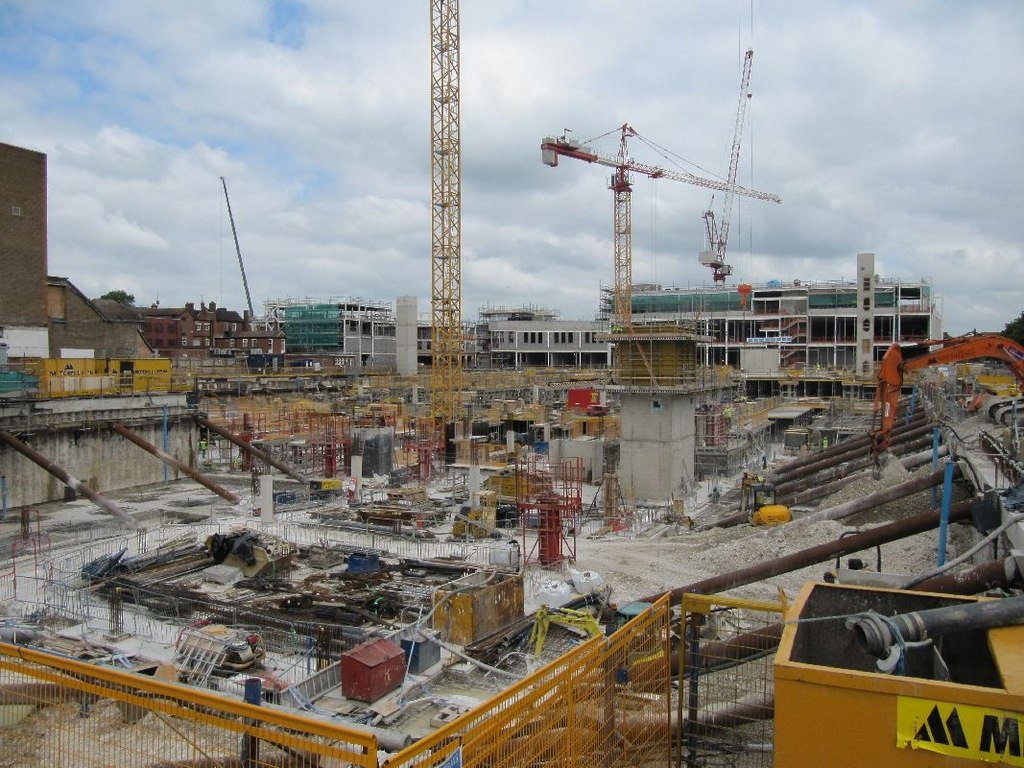
Construction in June 2010

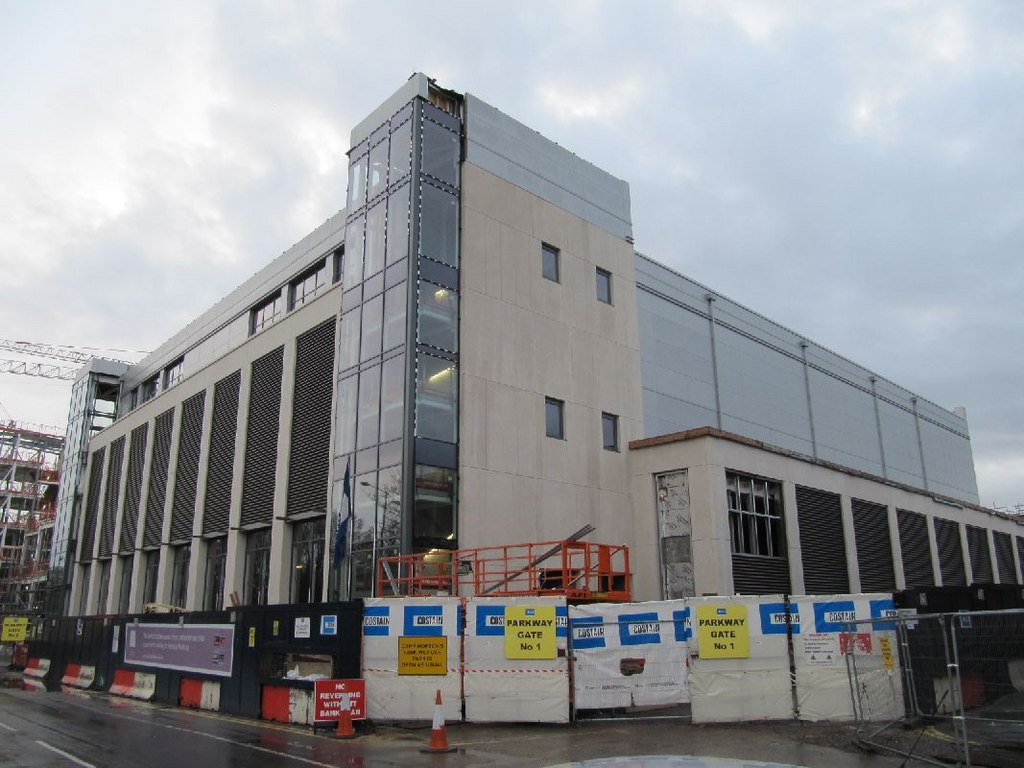
Construction in November 2010
