= Parkway, New Zealand =

Suburb of Lower Hutt, New Zealand

Parkway
- Suburb
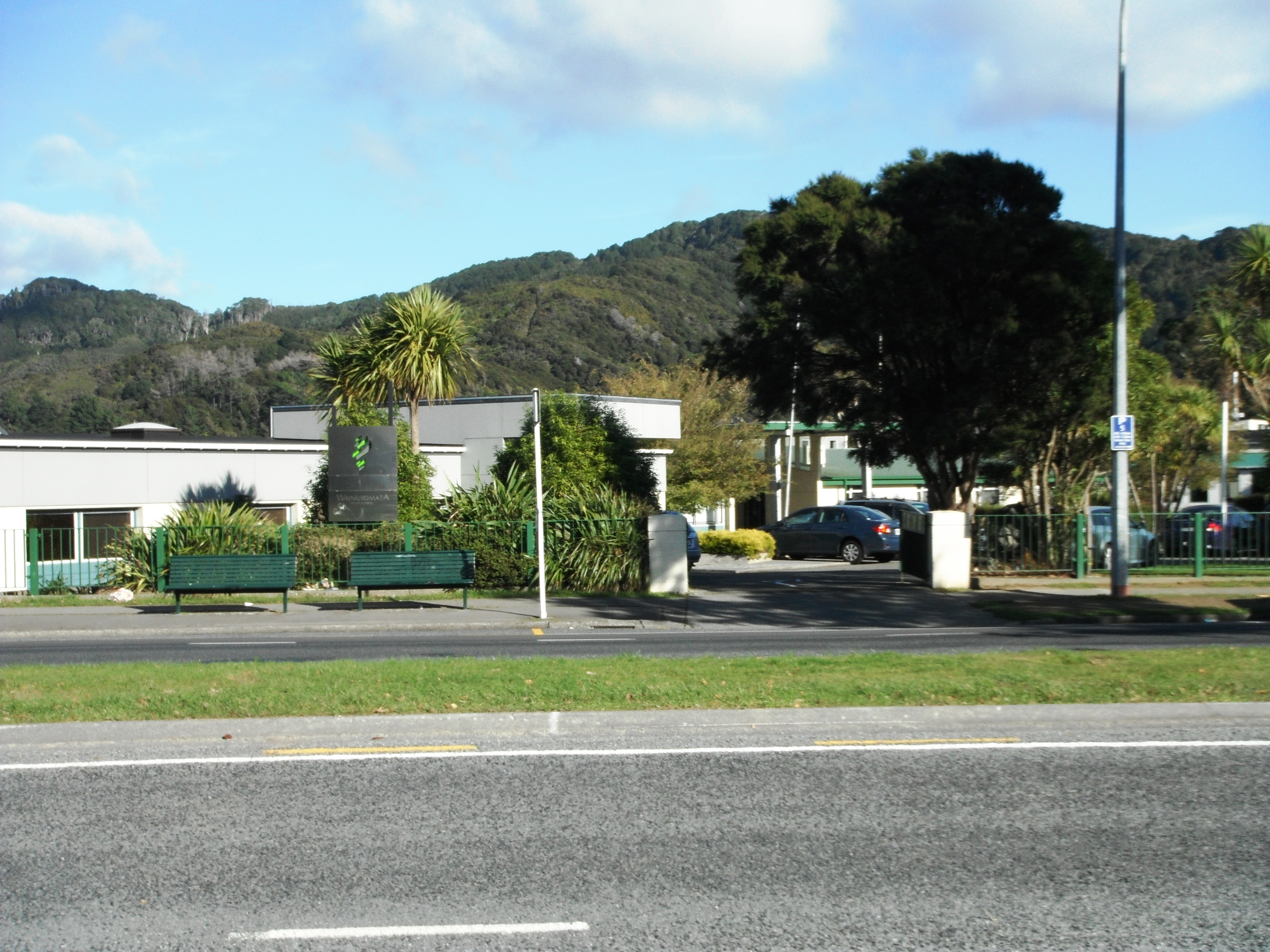
- Wainuiomata High School entrance
- Interactive map of Parkway
- Coordinates: 41.251°S 174.935°E
- Country: New Zealand
- City: Lower Hutt City
- Local authority: Hutt City Council
- Electoral ward: Wainuiomata
- Community board: Wainuiomata Community

Area
  - Land: 211 ha (520 acres)

Population (June 2025)
  - Total: 4,200
  - Density: 2,000/km^{2} (5,200/sq mi)

Gracefield		Arakura
	Parkway	Glendale
		Wainuiomata Central

Parkway is a suburb of Wainuiomata, part of Lower Hutt city situated in the lower North Island of New Zealand.

== Demographics ==
Wainuiomata West statistical area, which corresponds to Parkway, covers 2.11 km^{2} (0.81 sq mi). It had an estimated population of 4,200 as of June 2025, with a population density of 1,991 people per km^{2}.

Historical population
Year	Pop.	±% p.a.
2006	3,336	—
2013	3,432	+0.41%
2018	3,570	+0.79%
2023	3,849	+1.52%

Wainuiomata West had a population of 3,849 in the 2023 New Zealand census, an increase of 279 people (7.8%) since the 2018 census, and an increase of 417 people (12.2%) since the 2013 census. There were 1,902 males, 1,932 females, and 15 people of other genders in 1,311 dwellings. 3.0% of people identified as LGBTIQ+. The median age was 34.7 years (compared with 38.1 years nationally). There were 807 people (21.0%) aged under 15 years, 756 (19.6%) aged 15 to 29, 1,845 (47.9%) aged 30 to 64, and 441 (11.5%) aged 65 or older.

People could identify as more than one ethnicity. The results were 59.2% European (Pākehā); 22.7% Māori; 17.6% Pasifika; 20.3% Asian; 1.0% Middle Eastern, Latin American and African New Zealanders (MELAA); and 1.7% other, which includes people giving their ethnicity as "New Zealander". English was spoken by 95.0%, Māori by 6.1%, Samoan by 6.3%, and other languages by 15.6%. No language could be spoken by 2.9% (e.g. too young to talk). New Zealand Sign Language was known by 0.5%. The percentage of people born overseas was 27.0, compared with 28.8% nationally.

Religious affiliations were 36.6% Christian, 5.1% Hindu, 1.3% Islam, 1.1% Māori religious beliefs, 0.9% Buddhist, 0.4% New Age, and 2.5% other religions. People who answered that they had no religion were 45.8%, and 6.2% of people did not answer the census question.

Of those at least 15 years old, 612 (20.1%) people had a bachelor's or higher degree, 1,641 (53.9%) had a post-high school certificate or diploma, and 792 (26.0%) people exclusively held high school qualifications. The median income was $49,900, compared with $41,500 nationally. 279 people (9.2%) earned over $100,000 compared to 12.1% nationally. The employment status of those at least 15 was 1,830 (60.2%) full-time, 297 (9.8%) part-time, and 90 (3.0%) unemployed.

== Education ==
Wainuiomata High School is a state secondary (Year 9–13) school, and has 707 students. It was established in 2002 following the merger of Parkway College (opened 1972) and Wainuiomata College (opened 1963).

Wainuiomata Intermediate School is a state intermediate (Year 7–8) school, and has 341 students. It was established in 2002 following the merger of Parkway Intermediate School (opened 1970) and Wainuiomata Intermediate School (opened 1974).

Konini Primary School is a state contributing primary (Year 1–6) school and has 269 students. It was established in 200 following the merger of Parkway School (opened 1969) and Sun Valley School (opened 1978).

All these schools are coeducational. Rolls are as of July 2026.
