= Ralph J. Bunche III =

American lawyer and politician (born 1978)

- Born: 1978 (age 47–48)
- Education: Keele University (BA); University of Essex (MA); Columbia Law School (JD)
- Occupations: Human rights lawyer; former General Secretary of the Unrepresented Nations and Peoples Organization
- Relatives: Ralph Bunche (grandfather)

Ralph J. Bunche III (born 1978) is an American lawyer and human rights activist. Between 2008 and 2009, he advised, as in-house counsel, two Ministers of Finance of Liberia, Antoinette Sayeh and Augustine Kpehe Ngafuan on matters including the elimination of approximately US$1.2bn in foreign debt and foreign investment in the extractive industries and agricultural sectors. After leaving law practice he served in senior positions for the OSCE Mission in Kosovo and Fair Trials before being elected in September 2018 as General Secretary of the Unrepresented Nations and Peoples Organization (UNPO), a position he held for three 18-month terms alongside serving as the representative of Cornwall to the European Union.

== Education and family ==
Bunche received his B.A. degree from Keele University in 2000, his M.A. from the University of Essex in 2002 and his J.D. from Columbia Law School in 2006.

His grandfather was African-American political and social scientist Ralph Bunche who served the United Nations in various capacities and was awarded the Nobel Peace Prize in 1950 for his work as mediator in Israel's war of Independence in 1948–1949.

== Time at the Unrepresented Nations and Peoples Organization ==
The UNPO is a membership organization, which during Bunche's time, consisted of states with limited recognition, such as Somaliland and Taiwan, governments of territories that have been colonized, occupied or otherwise do not have full rights to self-government, such as Guam and Tibet, and indigenous and minority peoples movements from around the world, all unified by a shared limitations with regards to participation in international or national-level governance. Bunche was elected as the General Secretary of the Organization in September 2018.

Bunche's time at the organization was characterized by a period of significant transformation, following a 15-year period under one General Secretary during which time the organization had primarily focused on helping its members organize meetings at the European Union. Bunche shifted the organization's focus towards a more programmatic and campaigns-oriented approach, launching notable campaigns developing understanding of right of self-determination of peoples, efforts by authoritarian states to target self-determination defenders at home and abroad, and revitalizing the UNPO membership and participation structures, particularly as related to women.

By the conclusion of Bunche's time at the UNPO, the organization had opened a representative offices before the United Nations and in North America, launched a new UNPO youth network, published a large number of in-depth research reports into the right to self-determination and the targeting of self-determination defenders, and scored numerous victories on the part of UNPO member communities in cases brought before international and regional human rights bodies, including a successful action against the government of Ethiopia for crimes against humanity, and a first-of-its-kind recognition from the United Nations of the violation by the United States of America of the right to self-determination of the indigenous peoples of Guam. Bunche also successfully launched a reform effort of the organization that led to greater women participation at the UNPO, including the election of women to the roles of UNPO President and Vice-Presidents for the first time in the organization’s history.

These efforts helped the organization raise its profile, for example being selected to support the UN Special Rapporteur on minority issues in the organization of regional minority forums. In March 2022, Bunche notified the organization of his intention to resign in order to safeguard the reforms he had initiated.
