= Ralph Bunche =

American political scientist (1904–1971)

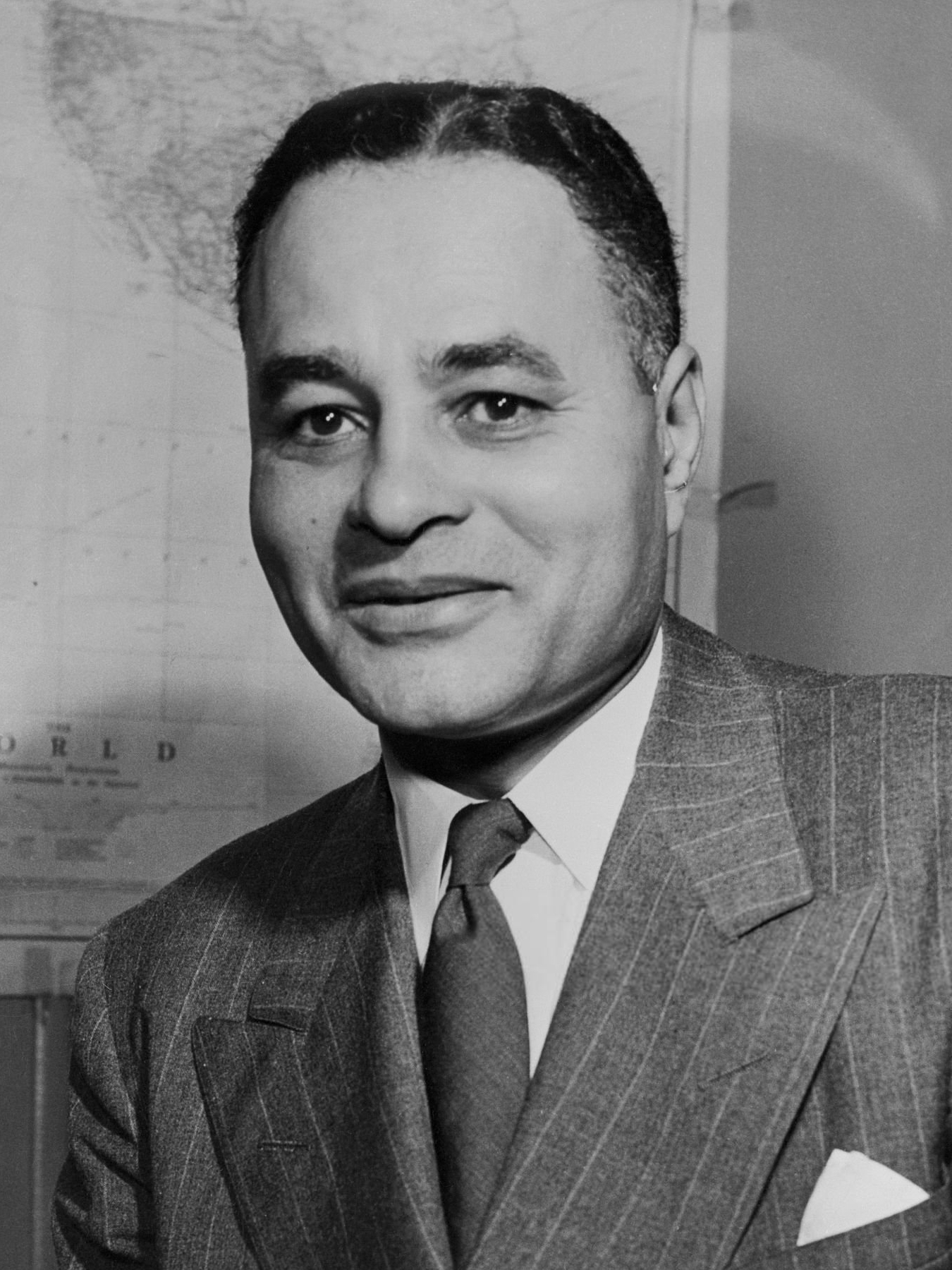
- Bunche in 1955
- Born: Ralph Johnson Bunche; August 7, 1904; Detroit, Michigan, US
- Died: December 9, 1971 (aged 67); New York City, US
- Education: University of California, Los Angeles (BA); Howard University (MA); Harvard University (PhD)
- Known for: Mediation in Israel; Nobel Peace Prize (1950)
- Children: 3
- Relatives: Ralph J. Bunche III (grandson)

Signature
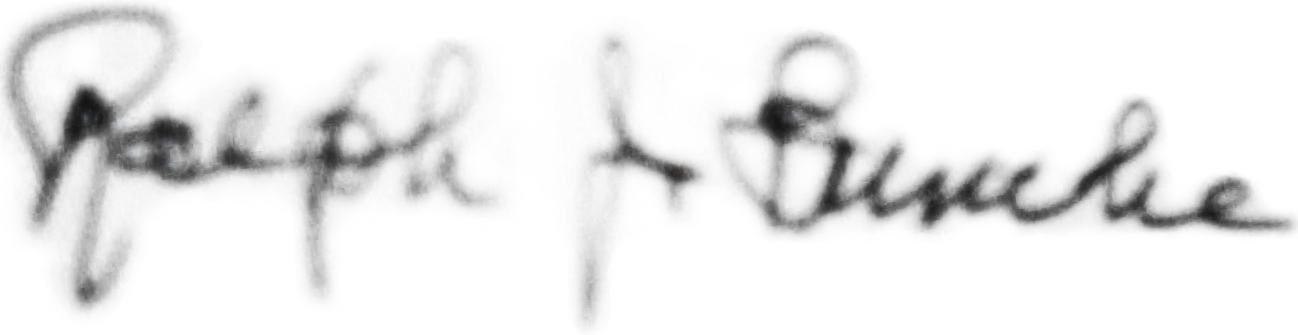

Ralph Johnson Bunche (/bʌntʃ/ BUNCH; August 7, 1904 – December 9, 1971) was an American political scientist and diplomat who received the 1950 Nobel Peace Prize for his late 1940s mediation in the Arab–Israeli conflict. He was the first Black Nobel laureate. He was also involved in the formation and early administration of the United Nations, serving as the under‑secretary‑general and briefly the acting secretary-general in 1953, and played a major role in both the decolonization process and numerous United Nations peacekeeping operations.

Bunche served on the US delegation to both the Dumbarton Oaks Conference in 1944 and United Nations Conference on International Organization in 1945 that drafted the UN charter. He then served on the American delegation to the first session of the United Nations General Assembly in 1946 and joined the UN as head of the Trusteeship Department, beginning a long series of troubleshooting roles and responsibilities related to decolonization. In 1948, Bunche became an acting mediator for the Middle East, negotiating an armistice between Egypt and Israel. For this success he was awarded the Nobel Peace Prize in 1950.

Bunche continued to serve at the UN, working on crises in the Sinai (1956), the Congo (1960), Yemen (1963), Cyprus (1964) and Bahrain (1970), reporting directly to the UN Secretary-General. He chaired study groups dealing with water resources in the Middle East. In 1957, he was promoted to under-secretary-general for special political affairs, having prime responsibility for peacekeeping roles. In 1965, Bunche supervised the ceasefire following the war between India and Pakistan. He retired from the UN in June 1971, dying six months later.

In 1963, he was awarded the Presidential Medal of Freedom by President John F. Kennedy. At the UN, Bunche gained such fame that Ebony magazine proclaimed him perhaps the most influential African American of the first half of the 20th century and "[f]or nearly a decade, he was the most celebrated African American of his time both [in the US] and abroad."

== Early life and education ==
Bunche was born in Detroit, Michigan, in 1904 and baptized at the city's Second Baptist Church. When Ralph was a child, his family moved to Toledo, Ohio, where his father looked for work. They returned to Detroit in 1909 after his sister Grace was born, with the help of their maternal aunt, Ethel Johnson. Their father did not live with the family again after Ohio and had not been "a good provider". But he followed them when they moved to New Mexico.

Because of the declining health of his mother and uncle, the family moved to Albuquerque, New Mexico, in 1915. His mother, "a musically inclined woman who contributed much to what her son called a household 'bubbling over with ideas and opinions'", died in 1917 from tuberculosis, and his uncle shortly thereafter. Thereafter, Bunche was raised by his maternal grandmother, Lucy Taylor Johnson, whom he credited with instilling in him his pride in his race and his self-belief.

In 1918, Lucy Taylor Johnson moved with the two Bunche grandchildren to the South Central neighborhood of Los Angeles.

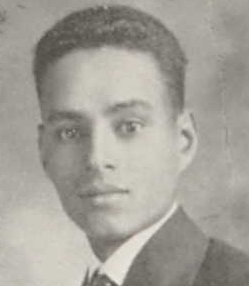
Bunche in the Jefferson High School yearbook, 1922

Bunche was a brilliant student, a debater, athlete and the valedictorian of his graduating class at Jefferson High School. He attended the University of California, Los Angeles (UCLA) as a political science student, and graduated summa cum laude and Phi Beta Kappa in 1927 as the valedictorian of his class. Using the money his community raised for his studies, a one-year Rosenwald fellowship, from philanthropist Julius Rosenwald, which enabled him to travel to Africa to study Administration in Togoland and Dahomey, and a graduate scholarship at Harvard University, he earned a doctorate in political science.

== Academic career ==
Bunche earned a master's degree in political science in 1928 and a doctorate in 1934, while he was already teaching in the Department of Political Science at Howard University, a historically black college. At the time, it was typical for doctoral candidates to start teaching before completion of their dissertations. He was the first African American to gain a PhD in political science from an American university. Bunche's 1934 dissertation, "French Administration in Togoland and Dahomey", won the Toppan Prize for the best dissertation on comparative politics in the Department of Government at Harvard University. The dissertation examined the mandates system of the League of Nations, arguing that the system was indistinguishable from formal empire.

From 1936 to 1938, Bunche studied anthropology and conducted postdoctoral research at Northwestern University in Evanston, Illinois, and at the London School of Economics, and later at the University of Cape Town in South Africa.

He published his first book, A World View of Race, in 1936, arguing that "race is a social concept which can be and is employed effectively to rouse and rationalize emotions [and] an admirable device for the cultivation of group prejudices." In 1940, Bunche served as the chief research associate to Swedish sociologist Gunnar Myrdal's landmark study of racial dynamics in the US, An American Dilemma: The Negro Problem and Modern Democracy.

For more than two decades (1928–1950), Bunche served as chair of the Department of Political Science at Howard University, where he also taught. Furthermore, he contributed to the Howard School of International Relations with his work regarding the effect racism and imperialism had on global economic systems and international relations. He was also inducted into Pi Sigma Alpha, the National Political Science Honor Society in 1956.

Bunche was elected to the American Philosophical Society in 1950. He was the first Black member to be inducted into the Society since its founding in 1743. During 1953 and 1954, he served as the president of the American Political Science Association. He served as a member of the Board of Overseers of his alma mater, Harvard University from 1960 to 1965, as a member of the board of the Institute of International Education, and as a trustee of Oberlin College, Lincoln University, and New Lincoln School.

== World War II years ==
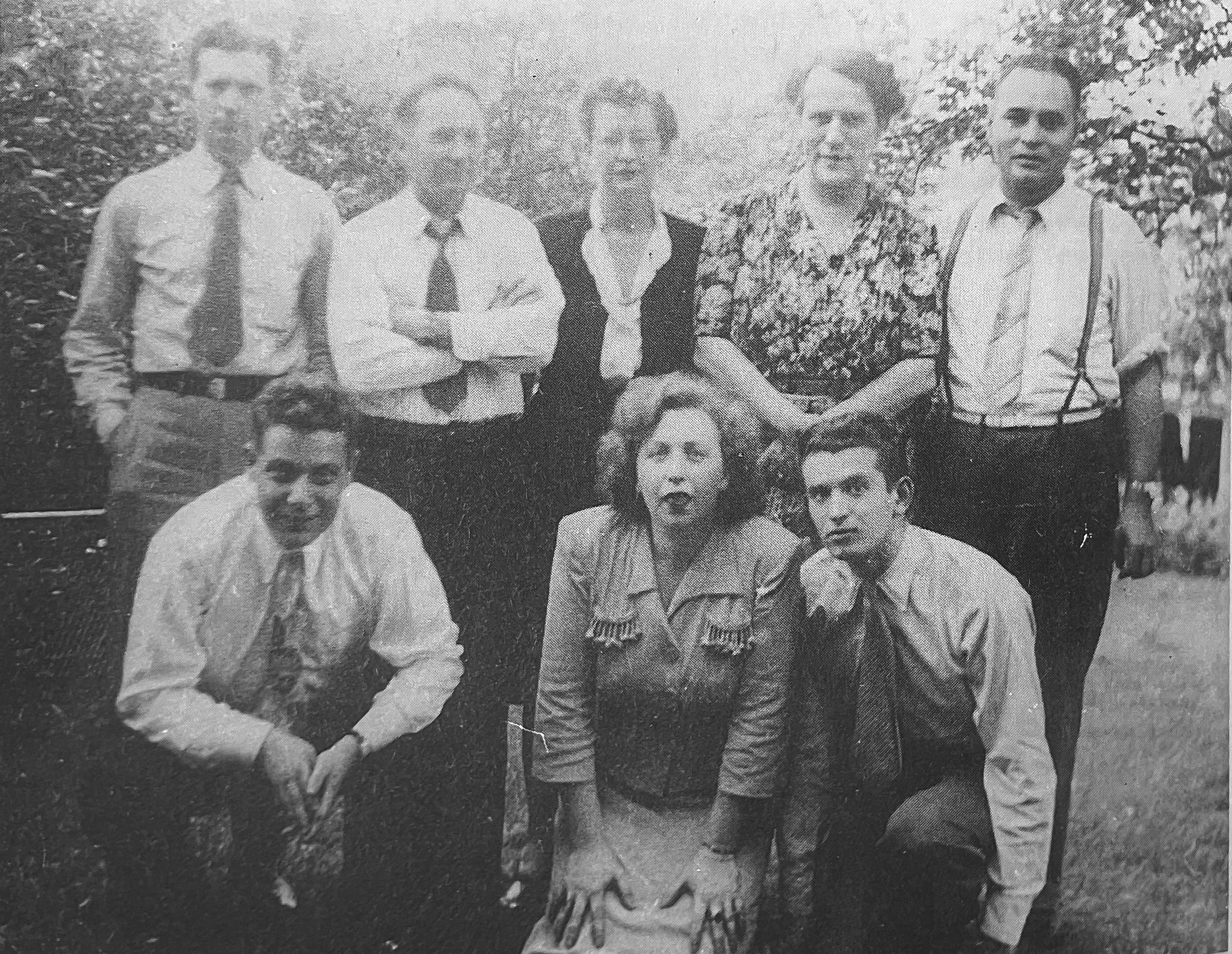
A declassified photograph of Bunche (top right) and members of his staff during World War II. He was the head of the Africa Research Section of the Office of Strategic Services.

In 1941–1943, Bunche worked in the Research and Analysis Branch (R&A) of the Office of Strategic Services (OSS), the wartime intelligence service, as a senior social analyst on Colonial Affairs. In 1943, he was transferred from the OSS to the State Department. He was appointed Associate Chief of the Division of Dependent Area Affairs under Alger Hiss. With Hiss, Bunche became one of the leaders of the Institute of Pacific Relations (IPR). He participated in the preliminary planning for the United Nations at the San Francisco Conference of 1945. In 2008, the National Archives and Records Administration released a 51-page PDF of his OSS records, which is available online.

== United Nations ==
Near the close of World War II in 1944, Bunche took part in planning for the United Nations at the Dumbarton Oaks Conference, held in Washington, D.C. He was an adviser to the US delegation for the Charter Conference of the United Nations held in 1945, when the governing document was drafted. Together with First Lady Eleanor Roosevelt, Bunche was instrumental in the creation and adoption of the Universal Declaration of Human Rights in 1948. Bunche urged African Americans to take UN positions. "Negroes ought to get busy and prepare to obtain some of the jobs in the United Nations' set-up," he counseled. "There are going to be all kinds of jobs and Negroes should attempt to get jobs on all levels. Some organization should be working on this now."

According to the United Nations document "Ralph Bunche: Visionary for Peace", during his 25 years of service to the United Nations, he

... championed the principle of equal rights for everyone, regardless of race or creed. He believed in 'the essential goodness of all people, and that no problem in human relations is insoluble.' Through the UN Trusteeship Council, Bunche readied the international stage for a period of rapid transformation, dismantling the old colonial systems in Africa and Asia, and guiding scores of emerging nations through the transition to independence in the post-war era.

=== Decolonization ===
Bunche's work to end colonialism began early in his academic career. Over time, he became a leading scholar and expert of the impact of colonialism on subjugated peoples. He developed close relationships with many anti-colonial leaders and intellectuals from the Caribbean and Africa, in particular during his field research and his time at the London School of Economics. Bunche characterized economic policies in colonies and mandates as exploitative, and argued that the colonial powers misrepresented the nature of their rule. He argued that the Permanent Mandates Commission needed expanded powers to investigate how the mandates were governed.

Bunche's work on decolonization was influenced by the work of Raymond Leslie Buell. However, Bunche disagreed with Buell on the relative merits of British and French colonial rule. Bunche argued that British rule was not more progressive than its French counterpart, claiming that it was characterized by paternalism at best and white supremacy at worst. At a speech in Cleveland, Bunche said: "The modern world has come to the realisation that there is a great moral issue involved in the perpetuation of the colonial system."

Historian Susan Pedersen describes Bunche as the "architect" of the United Nations' trusteeship regime. Bunche was a principal author of the chapters in the UN charter on non-self-determining territories and trusteeship. He was later head of the Trusteeship Division of the UN.

=== Arab–Israeli conflict and Nobel Peace Prize ===
Beginning in 1947, Bunche was involved in efforts to resolve the Arab–Israeli conflict. He served as assistant to the United Nations Special Committee on Palestine, and thereafter as the principal secretary of the UN Palestine Commission. The committee traveled around the country in June–July 1947, where it was warmly welcomed by the Jewish community. During this time the committee also met secretly with Menachem Begin, later prime minister of Israel, then wanted by the British. Bunche described this trip as his "most exciting adventure in the Land of Israel."

In 1948, he traveled to the Middle East as the chief aide to Sweden's Count Folke Bernadotte, who had been appointed by the UN to mediate the conflict. These men chose the island of Rhodes for their base and working headquarters. In September 1948, Bernadotte was assassinated in Jerusalem by members of the underground Jewish Lehi group, which was led by Yitzhak Shamir and referred to its members as terrorists and admitted to having carried out terrorist attacks.

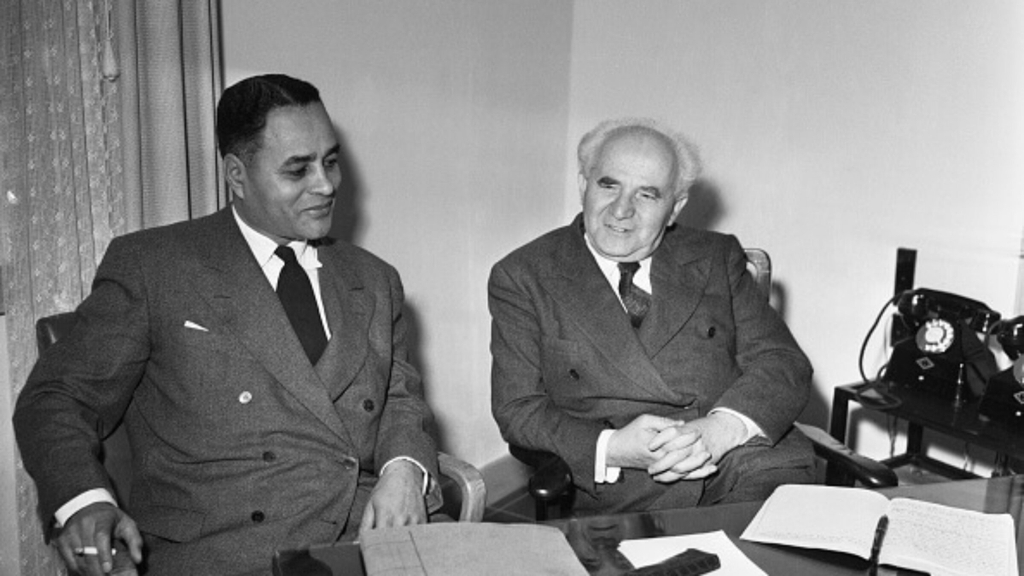
Bunche with Israeli Prime Minister David Ben-Gurion, 12 December 1948

Following the assassination, Bunche became the UN's chief mediator; he conducted all future negotiations on Rhodes. The representative for Israel was Moshe Dayan; he reported in memoirs that much of his delicate negotiation with Bunche was conducted over a billiard table while the two were shooting pool. Optimistically, Bunche commissioned a local potter to create unique memorial plates bearing the name of each negotiator. When the agreement was signed, Bunche presented these gifts. After unwrapping his, Dayan asked Bunche what might have happened if no agreement had been reached. "I'd have broken the plates over your damn heads," Bunche answered. For achieving the 1949 Armistice Agreements, Bunche received the Nobel Peace Prize in 1950.

Bunche continued to work for the United Nations, mediating in other strife-torn regions, including the Congo, Yemen, Kashmir, and Cyprus. Bunche was appointed Under-Secretary-General of the United Nations in 1968. While at the UN, Bunche forged a close bond with his friend and colleague, Ambassador Charles W. Yost, with whom he had worked at the UN founding conference.

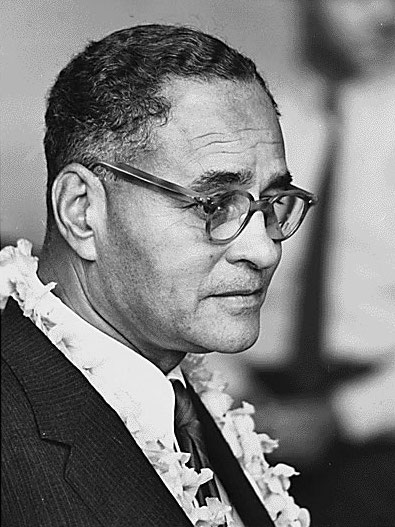
Bunche at the 1963 March on Washington

Bunche was actively involved in movements for black liberation in his pre-United Nations days, including through leadership positions with various civil rights organizations and as one of the leading scholars on the issue of race in the US and colonialism abroad. During his time at the United Nations, Bunche remained a vocal supporter of the US Civil Rights Movement despite his activities being somewhat constrained by the codes governing international civil servants. He participated in the 1963 March on Washington, where Martin Luther King Jr. gave his "I Have a Dream" speech, and also, marching side by side with King, in the Selma to Montgomery march in 1965, which contributed to passage of the landmark Voting Rights Act of 1965 and federal enforcement of voting rights. As a result of his activism in the pre-war period, Bunche was a topic of discussion in the House Un-American Activities Committee. However, he was never a communist or Marxist, and indeed came under very heavy attack from the pro-Soviet press during his career.

Bunche lived in the Kew Gardens neighborhood of Queens, New York, in a home purchased with his Nobel Prize money, from 1953 until his death. Like many other people of color, Bunche continued to struggle against racism across the United States and sometimes in his own neighborhood. In 1959, he and his son, Ralph Jr., were denied membership in the West Side Tennis Club in the Forest Hills neighborhood of Queens. After the issue was given national coverage by the press, the club offered the Bunches an apology and invitation of membership. The official who had rebuffed them resigned. Bunche refused the offer, saying it was not based on racial equality and was an exception based only on his personal prestige. During his UN career, Bunche turned down appointments from presidents Harry Truman and John Kennedy, because of the Jim Crow laws still in effect in Washington, D.C. Historian John Hope Franklin credits him with "creating a new category of leadership among African-Americans" due to his unique ability "to take the power and prestige he accumulated...to address the problems of his community."

Bunche denounced the Watts riots, which led to a critique from the black power movement. He took the critique seriously and following his daughter's suicide came to sympathize with the riots, calling them a violent rejection of unjust authority.

== Marriage and family ==
While teaching at Howard University in 1928, Bunche met Ruth Harris, who was a first-grade teacher in Washington, D.C. They later started seeing each other and married June 23, 1930. The couple had three children: Joan Harris Bunche (1931–2015), Jane Johnson Bunche (1933–1966), and Ralph J. Bunche Jr. (1943–2016). His grandson, Ralph J. Bunche III, is the former general secretary of the Unrepresented Nations and Peoples Organization, an international membership organization established to facilitate the voices of unrepresented and marginalized nations and peoples worldwide.

On October 9, 1966, their daughter Jane Bunche Pierce fell or jumped from the roof of her apartment building in Riverdale, Bronx; her death was believed to be suicide. She left no note. She and her husband Burton Pierce, a Cornell alumnus and labor relations executive, had three children. Their apartment was on the first floor of the building.

== Death ==
Bunche resigned from his position at the UN due to ill health, but this was not announced, as Secretary-General U Thant hoped he would be able to return soon. His health did not improve, and Bunche died December 9, 1971, from complications of heart disease, kidney disease, and diabetes. He was 67. He is buried in Woodlawn Cemetery in the Bronx, New York City.

== Honors ==
=== Awards ===
- In 1949, he was awarded the Spingarn Medal from the NAACP.
- In 1950, he was awarded the Nobel Peace Prize, for his work in resolving the Arab-Israeli conflict in Palestine
- In 1951, Bunche was awarded the Silver Buffalo Award by the Boy Scouts of America for his work in scouting and positive impact for the world
- In 2002, scholar Molefi Kete Asante included Bunche on his list of 100 Greatest African Americans.
- In 2004, Bunche was posthumously honored with the William J. Donovan Award from the OSS Society.
- A scholarship at UCLA was named for him. The Ralph Bunche Committee, in the UCLA Alumni Association's Alumni Scholars Club, is named for him.
- A scholarship at Colby College was named for him
- In 1963, Bunche was awarded the Presidential Medal of Freedom. He was the first recipient to be awarded the medal with distinction.

=== Memorials ===
- On February 11, 1972, the site of his birth in Detroit was listed as a Michigan Historic Site. His widow, Ruth Bunche, attended the unveiling of a historical marker on April 27, 1972.
- The Ralph Bunche Institute for International Studies at City University of New York, engages in research, graduate training, and public education in the fields of international studies and contemporary global problem-solving. It was founded in 1973 as the Ralph Bunche Institute on the United Nations and was renamed in 2001.
- On January 12, 1982, the United States Postal Service issued a Great Americans series 20-cent postage stamp in his honor.
- In 1996, Howard University named its international affairs center, a physical facility and associated administrative programs, the Ralph J. Bunche International Affairs Center. The center is the site of lectures and internationally oriented programming.

=== Buildings ===
- Colgate University has the Ralph J. Bunche House which is a housing option available to juniors and seniors and can also be home to special interest groups.
- Bunche Hall, named in his honor, at UCLA. A bust of Bunche was erected at the entrance
- The Ralph J. Bunche Library of the US Department of State is the oldest Federal government library. Founded by the first secretary of state, Thomas Jefferson, in 1789, it was dedicated to and renamed the Ralph J. Bunche Library on May 5, 1997. It is located in the Harry S. Truman Building, the main State Department headquarters.
- A neighborhood of West Oakland, home to Ralph Bunche High School, is also known as "Ralph Bunche".
- Elementary schools were named after him in Midland, Texas; Markham, Illinois; Flint, Michigan; Detroit, Michigan; Ecorse, Michigan; Canton, Georgia; Miami, Florida; Fort Wayne, Indiana; Tulsa, Oklahoma; Carson, California; Metairie, Louisiana; Anne Arundel County, Maryland and New York City; high schools were named after him in West Oakland, California and King George County, Virginia (Ralph Bunche High School).
- The Dr. Ralph J. Bunche Peace and Heritage Center, his boyhood home with his grandmother, has been listed on the National Register of Historic Places and City of Los Angeles Historic-Cultural Landmarks, HCM #159. The building has been restored and is operated as an interpretive house Museum and Community Center.
- In Glasgow, Kentucky, the Liberty District-Ralph Bunche Community Center, to support community relations and cultural understanding, was named in his honor.

=== Parks ===
- Ralph Bunche Park was named for him in New York City; it is located across First Avenue from the United Nations headquarters.
- Near Fort Myers, Florida, historically black beaches in the age of segregation, had been named Bunche Beach
- The neighborhood of Bunche Park in the city of Miami Gardens, Florida, was named in his honor.
- Ralph Bunche Road in Nairobi, Kenya, is named after him.
- Bunche Park in Fort Worth, Texas was named in his honor in 1954.

== Historic Places ==
Several of Bunche's residences are listed on the National Register of Historic Places

Name	Location	Years of Residence	Notes
Ralph J. Bunche House	Los Angeles, California	1919?–1928?	Also a Los Angeles Historical-Cultural Monument.
Ralph Bunche House	Washington, D.C.	1941–1947	Built for Bunche.
Parkway Village	Queens, New York	1947–1952	Apartment complex built for UN employees.
Ralph Johnson Bunche House	Queens, New York	1952–1971	Also a National Historic Landmark and a New York City designated landmark.

== Filmography ==
- Ralph Bunche: An American Odyssey (2001)
- Ralph Bunche: The Odyssey Continues... (2003)

== Selected bibliography ==
- Bunche, Ralph (1936). A World View of Race. Bronze Booklet Series. Washington, D.C.: Associates in Negro Folk Education. ASIN B004D6VKAQ. "Reprint, Port Washington: Kennikat Press, 1968; excerpt in Ralph Bunche: Selected Speeches and Writings, edited by Charles P. Henry"
- Bunche, Ralph (1973). Grantham, Dewey W. (ed.). The Political Status of the Negro in the Age of FDR. Chicago: University of Chicago Press. ISBN 978-0-226-08029-1. "Edited with an Introduction by Dewey W. Grantham. A version of a Ralph Bunche 1941 research memorandum prepared for the Carnegie-Myrdal study, The Negro in America"
- Bunche, Ralph (2005). Holloway, Jonathan Scott (ed.). A Brief and Tentative Analysis of Negro Leadership. New York: New York University Press. ISBN 978-0-8147-3684-5. "edited with an Introduction by Jonathan Scott Holloway, A version of The Negro in America"
- Edgar, Robert R., ed. (1992). An African American in South Africa: The Travel Notes of Ralph J. Bunche, September 28, 1937 – January 1, 1938. Athens: Ohio University Press. ISBN 978-0-8214-1394-4.
- Henry, Charles P., ed. (1995). Ralph J. Bunche: Selected Speeches and Writings. Ann Arbor: University of Michigan Press. ISBN 978-0-472-10589-2.

== See also ==
- List of African American firsts
- Black Nobel Prize laureates

Political offices
Preceded by Position Created	Under-Secretary-General of the United Nations for Special Political Affairs; 1961–1971	Succeeded by Brian Urquhart
