= Dewayne Bunch (Kentucky politician) =

American politician

Member of the Kentucky House of Representatives from the 82nd district
- In office January 1, 2011 – October 26, 2011
- Preceded by: Charlie Siler
- Succeeded by: Regina Bunch

Personal details
- Born: February 22, 1962
- Died: July 11, 2012 (aged 50)
- Party: Republican

DeWayne Bunch (February 22, 1962 – July 11, 2012) was an American teacher and a Republican politician in Kentucky.

== Biography ==
Bunch taught mathematics and science at Whitley County High School in Williamsburg, Kentucky. He also was a member of the Kentucky National Guard for 23 years and served a tour of duty in Iraq. In 2010 he was elected to the Kentucky House of Representatives, defeating incumbent Charlie Siler to represent the 82nd district (Whitley County and part of Laurel County).

Bunch resigned his seat in the Kentucky House on October 26, 2011, following his head injury, and Kentucky Governor Steven Beshear called for a special election to be held December 20, 2011, to fill the rest of Bunch's term, which was to end December 31, 2012. DeWayne Bunch's wife Regina, a special education teacher at Whitley County Middle School, announced that she would seek to succeed him in office, running as a Republican. Local party leaders named Regina Bunch as their candidate. As of November 16, 2011, Democratic Party leaders in Whitley County said they were unlikely to nominate a candidate to oppose her.

== Head injury and death ==
On April 12, 2011, while attempting to break up a fight in the school cafeteria, Bunch was knocked down and hit his head on the floor, which the local sheriff described as being hard "like slate". In the immediate aftermath of the incident he was reported to be in "extremely critical condition", after being rushed to the University of Kentucky Medical Center in Lexington, where he was treated for more than two weeks, before being transferred to the Shepherd Center, a specialized facility in Atlanta for the treatment and rehabilitation of brain and spinal cord injuries. By June, he was communicating with his family, and had regained certain abilities, but as of October 2011, he was still a patient at the Shepherd Center.

Bunch died on July 11, 2012, from the injuries sustained the year before, aged 50.
