= Ralph Johnson Bunche House =

Historic house in Queens, New York

- U.S. National Register of Historic Places
- U.S. National Historic Landmark
- New York State Register of Historic Places
- New York City Landmark
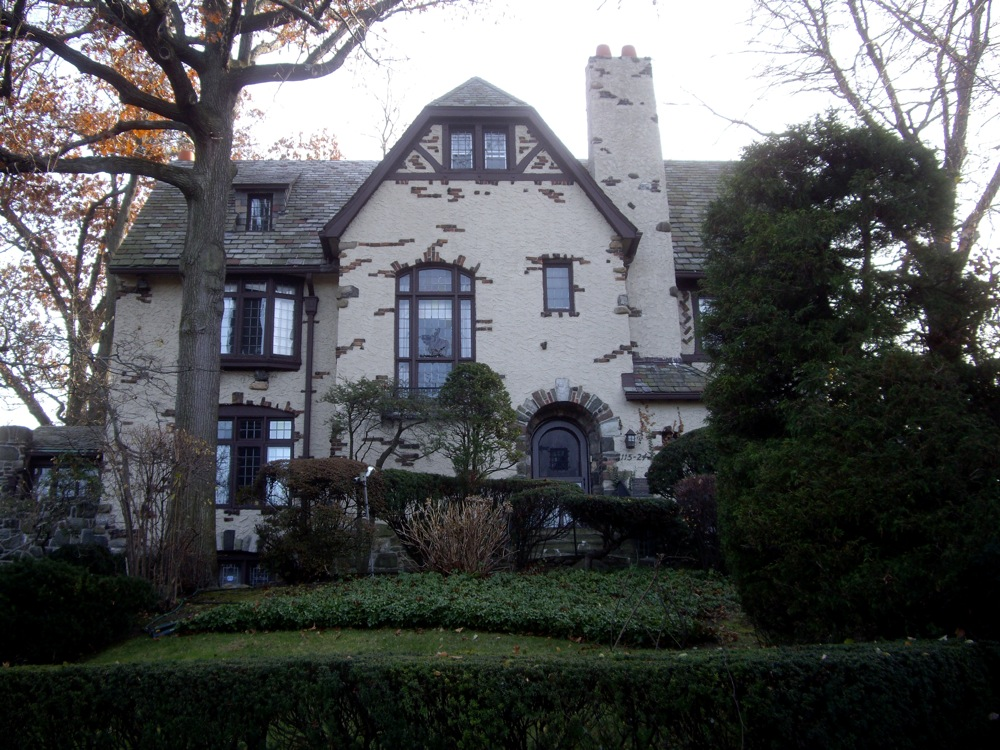
- Location: 115-24 Grosvenor Road, Kew Gardens, Queens, NY
- Coordinates: 40°42′23″N 73°50′13″W
- Built: 1927
- Architect: Koch & Wagner
- Architectural style: English Tudor Renaissance
- NRHP reference No.: 76001266
- NYSRHP No.: 08101.006404
- NYCL No.: 2175

Significant dates
- Added to NRHP: May 11, 1976
- Designated NHL: May 11, 1976
- Designated NYSRHP: June 23, 1980
- Designated NYCL: May 17, 2005

Ralph Johnson Bunche House, the last home of American diplomat Ralph Bunche (1903–1971), is a National Historic Landmark in New York City. It is a single-family home built in 1927 in the neo-Tudor style, and is located at 115–24 Grosvenor Road, Kew Gardens, Queens. It is named after Ralph Bunche, who helped to found the United Nations in 1945. In 1950, he became the first African American and first person of color to win the Nobel Peace Prize, for mediating armistice agreements between Israel and its neighboring countries.

== History ==
The Bunche house was developed in 1927 as part of the development of Kew Gardens. The property, in which the house was eventually constructed, was continually bought and sold over the years. The Kew Gardens Corporation sold this property to Elena Goodale in 1920, who later sold it to Louis Frisse in 1926, who constructed the house. In 1948, ownership of the property changed and in 1949, it was sold to Jack Sturm.

During the 1950s, Bunche lived in Parkway Village, an apartment complex in Kew Gardens Hills that was built for UN employees and that was one of the first in the country to be racially integrated. In 1952 Sturm sold the property to Ralph Bunche and his wife, who were raising three children; the couple used the award money that came with the Nobel Prize to buy the house. He lived in the house until his death in 1971, and his wife lived there until she died in 1988.

== Description ==
The style of which this house was built is a neo-Tudor style. It was designed by the prominent Brooklyn architects Koch & Wagner. The house stands at 2 1/2 stories and is faced in stucco pierced by random bricks and stones. The house maintains its original wooden doors with iron strapping; the original leaded glass windows and slate roof are also maintained. It is located in a suburban setting of single-family homes and is surrounded by mature trees and bushes. The house is also situated on the crest of a hill and contains a terraced flagstone walkway leading from the street to the front door. The house's attached gable is inset into the hill at the basement level. The house is faced with random ashlar stones and has an opening that is stone-framed and arched segmentally; this opening is filled by wooden doors with small plain glass lights and metal strapping. The house is three bays wide with a central, full height, projecting gable capped/adorned by a clipped roof. The doorway, within the gable, is built within a round arched, stone-trimmed opening and holds a wooden door with a small, rectangular window covered by a decorative iron grille. There is an original iron and glass lantern situated on the wall beside the door. Additionally, there is a small, rectangular window within the gable above the doorway, along with a large, double-height window to the side of the entrance. This window has leaded glass casements with a decorative stained glass motif of a knight on horseback at the bottom center of the window; this window is fronted by a small, iron balcony. A pair of small rectangular windows are built near the top of the gable and are surrounded by half-timber framing. There is a stucco-faced chimney on one side of the central gable. The lower section of the chimney projects toward the front and creates another small roof and shape variety. There is a small, open stone porch on the west side of the house's main section, while the east side contains a one-story, stone-faced sun room with floor-to-ceiling casement windows. This area is recessed behind a patio and the stone walls that rise up from the garage below.

== Landmark designations ==
The house was declared a National Historic Landmark in 1976. The house is also a New York City landmark.

== See also ==
- Ralph Bunche House (Washington, D.C.)
- Ralph J. Bunche House, in Los Angeles, where he spent his childhood.
- List of New York City Designated Landmarks in Queens
- List of National Historic Landmarks in New York City
- National Register of Historic Places listings in Queens County, New York
