= Ralph J. Bunche House =

Historic house in California, United States

- U.S. National Register of Historic Places
- Los Angeles Historic-Cultural Monument
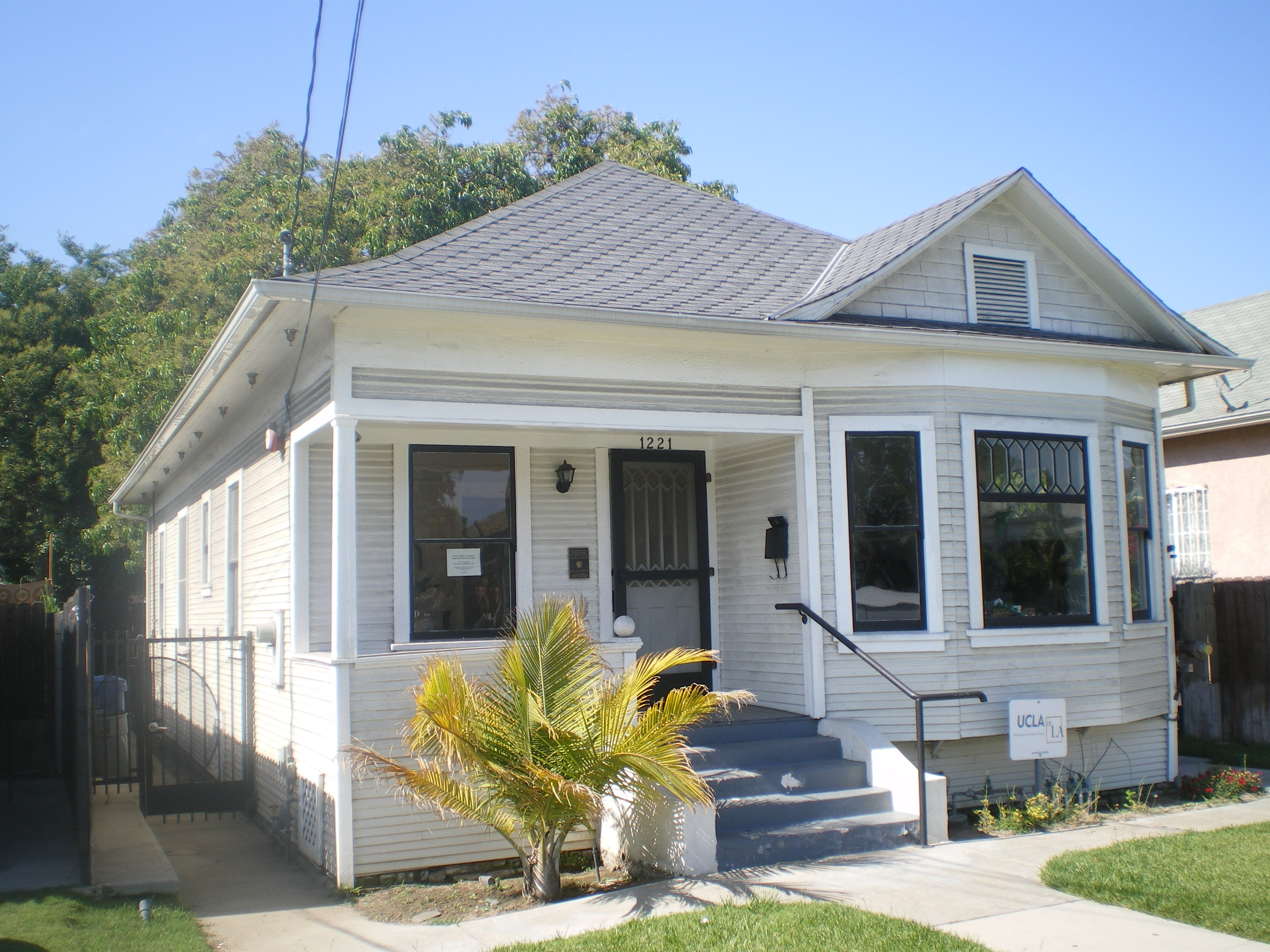
- Ralph J. Bunche House, 2008

- Location within the Los Angeles metropolitan area Location within California Location within the United States
- Location: 1221 E. 40th Place, Los Angeles, California
- Coordinates: 34°0′37″N 118°15′9″W
- Built: 1919
- Architectural style: Victorian-Bungalow
- NRHP reference No.: 78000686
- LAHCM No.: 159

Significant dates
- Added to NRHP: May 22, 1978
- Designated LAHCM: July 27, 1976

Ralph J. Bunche House, also known as the Ralph Bunche Peace & Heritage Center, is a Victorian-Bungalow style house in South Los Angeles, California, United States. It was the boyhood home of Nobel Peace Prize winner Ralph Bunche. It was declared a Los Angeles Historic-Cultural Monument (No. 159) by the Los Angeles Cultural Heritage Commission in 1976, and it was listed on the National Register of Historic Places in 1978.

== Bunche's boyhood home ==
Bunche was born in Detroit, Michigan and later lived in Albuquerque, New Mexico, but moved to Los Angeles to live with his maternal grandmother when his mother died in 1917. Bunche and his sister, Grace, were raised at the house on 40th Place by their grandmother, Lucy Taylor Johnson, their two aunts (Nelle and Ethel), and their uncle Thomas Johnson. While living in Los Angeles, Bunche became the valedictorian at both Jefferson High School, one-half block away, and UCLA, then located at Vermont Avenue and Melrose. Bunche was also a star basketball player while at UCLA. Bunche won the 1950 Nobel Peace Prize for his work in negotiating and drafting the 1949 Armistice Agreements that ended the 1948 Arab-Israeli War. He was the first person of color from any country to receive the Nobel Peace Prize.

== Restoration and museum ==
Bunche's boyhood home fell into disrepair and suffered from vandalism and graffiti in the 1980s and 1990s. The house sat vacant for a decade, "used only by squatters, taggers, gang members, and vagrants."

In 1996, the home was acquired by the Dunbar Economic Development Corp., a nonprofit group with plans to turn it into a museum. The group's plans were delayed by a lack of funding until the California Community Foundation issued a $100,000 interest-free loan in 1999.

After a 1999 news report about funding delays and graffiti covering the home, Mayor Richard Riordan donned a hardhat and joined a work crew in cleaning up the home.

=== Dr. Ralph J. Bunche Peace & Heritage Center ===
The home was preserved and furnished with photographs and memorabilia from Bunche's life. It operated as the Dr. Ralph J. Bunche Peace & Heritage Center, an interpretive museum and community center to promote peaceful interaction of all groups within South Central Los Angeles. The property was fully restored between 2002 and 2004, by Design Aid Architects, winning a Los Angeles Conservancy preservation award in 2006. That year, the house was described in the Los Angeles Times as "brilliant, with sunlight streaming through modified bay windows, scrubbed wood floors and an airy parlor/den/dining room."

=== Oral history project ===
The Dr. Ralph J. Bunche Peace and Heritage Center Oral History Project was a joint venture with UCLA intended to collect oral histories on Bunche's life in Los Angeles as well as the Central Avenue and Dunbar Hotel community in South Los Angeles. The oral histories collected by the project were displayed at the Ralph J. Bunche House until about 2011, when they were moved to UCLA.

The house now operates as a private residence.

== See also ==
- List of Los Angeles Historic-Cultural Monuments in South Los Angeles
- List of Registered Historic Places in Los Angeles
- Ralph Johnson Bunche House, the home in Queens, New York, where Bunche lived for 30 years until his death in 1971.
