= Tiaki Wai =

Water infrastructure organisation in Wellington Region, New Zealand

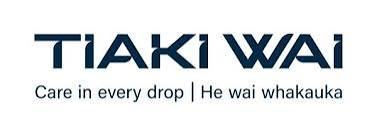
- Logo of Tiaki Wai
- Type: Council-controlled organisation
- Industry: Water industry Public works
- Predecessor: Wellington Water
- Founded: 1 July 2026; 3 months ago
- Headquarters: 81 The Esplanade, Petone, Lower Hutt, New Zealand
- Area served: Lower Hutt, Porirua, Upper Hutt, and Wellington
- Key people: Michael Brewster (chief executive)
- Owner: Lower Hutt, Porirua, Upper Hutt, and Wellington city councils, and Greater Wellington Regional Council
- Website: tiakiwai.co.nz

Tiaki Wai is a council-controlled organisation that is responsible for delivering drinking water, wastewater and stormwater services in the Wellington Region. It is the successor to Wellington Water and it formally came into existence on 1 July 2026. Tiaki Wai is a partnership between the five Wellington local government bodies (Wellington City Council, Porirua City Council, Lower Hutt City Council, Upper Hutt City Council and the Greater Wellington Regional Council) and two Māori mana whenua iwi (tribes) Ngāti Toa Rangatira and Taranaki Whānui ki te Upoko o te Ika.

== Etymology ==
Tiaki Wai translates from the Māori language as "carers of water." This reflects its mission statement of delivering "safe, reliable, environmentally and financially sustainable water services in a way that restores te mana o te wai." The name Tiaki Wai was gifted by the two mana whenua Ngāti Toa Rangatira and Taranaki Whānui ki te Upoko o te Ika.

== Functions and structure ==
Tiaki Wai is responsible for delivering drinking water, wastewater and stormwater services in the Wellington Region and assumes the functions and responsibilities of Wellington Water. It is headed by a four-member board of directors consisting of chair Will Peet, former Watercare Services CEO Jon Lamonte, Elena Trout and Adrian Wimmers.

== History ==
In late August 2025, the New Zealand Parliament passed legislation requiring local councils to develop water services delivery plans over the next 12 months as part of the Sixth National Government's Local Water Done Well programme. Local Water Done Well was the National-led government's policy to address New Zealand's water infrastructural challenges. The policy seeks to centre local ownership and decision-making over the delivery of water services while meeting economic, environmental and water quality regulatory requirements. Local Water Done Well replaced the Sixth Labour Government's controversial Three Waters programme.

In late June 2025, the Upper Hutt, Porirua, Lower Hutt, Wellington City Councils and the Greater Wellington Regional Council announced that Wellington Water would be replaced by a new water services entity that would own and manage the various councils' water infrastructure. The new entity would generate its own income independent of council funding and manage its own debts. This new entity is expected to come into existence on 1 July 2026.

Tiaki Wai and its board of directors were formally announced by the Wellington City Council on 30 October 2025. The WCC also confirmed that the new entity would be a partnership between the Wellington Regional local government bodies and the Māori iwi Ngāti Toa Rangatira and Taranaki Whānui ki te Upoko o te Ika. In early February 2026, Radio New Zealand reported that under the new Tiaki Wai framework, Wellington regional ratepayers would receive two set of water bills from Tiaki Wai and their district council.

In late May 2026, Radio New Zealand reported that Tiaki Wai's draft strategy involving rolling out 140,000 water meters in Wellington over the next five to seven years at an estimated cost of between $500–590 million. Following the release of the draft strategy, Mayor of Wellington Andrew Little and former Wellington city councillor Tim Brown expressed concern about the high cost of the rollout. In response, Tiaki Wai's chief executive Michael Brewster said that the information in the draft strategy was derived from the outgoing Wellington Water organisation and that Tiaki Wai's board was revisiting the costs in light of public concerns about cost of living pressures.

On 1 October 2026, the Greater Wellington Regional Council filed criminal charges against both Tiaki Wai and the Wellington City Council over their handling of the Moa Point wastewater spillage in February 2026. As the successor to Wellington Water, Tiaki Wai inherited its predecessor's responsibilities and liabilities.

== See also ==
- Water supply and sanitation in the Wellington Region
