= Rates (tax) =

Type of property tax

Rates are a type of property tax system in various countries, and in places with systems deriving from the British one, the proceeds of which are used to fund local government. Some other countries have taxes with a more or less comparable role, like France's taxe d'habitation.

== Rates by country ==
=== Australia ===
Local government authorities levy annual taxes, which are called council rates or shire rates. The basis on which these charges can be calculated varies from state to state, but is usually based in some way on the value of property. Even within states, individual local government authorities can often choose the specific basis of rates – for example, it may be on the rental value of houses (as in Western Australia) or on the unimproved land value (as in New South Wales). These rateable valuations are usually determined by a statutory authority, and are subject to periodic revision.

=== Canada ===
Rates are referred to as property taxes in Canada. These taxes are collected primarily by municipal governments on residential, industrial and commercial properties and are their main source of funding.

=== Hong Kong ===
Levied on domestic property as well as non-domestic premises. Prior to 2000, it was used to fund municipal services, the responsibility of the now-abolished Urban Council and Regional Council, through the Urban Services Department and Regional Services Department. The revenue now goes to the Treasury. The bill is issued quarterly.

=== Ireland ===
Business rates and domestic rates existed in Ireland as part of the United Kingdom of Great Britain and Ireland and were retained after independence. Business or commercial rates are still collected. Fianna Fáil promised to abolish domestic rates in its 1977 general election manifesto, won a landslide, and implemented this with effect from 1979. Local authorities lost 33% of their budget and made cutbacks. From the mid 1980s until 1997, most levied "water charges" to make up part of the shortfall. In 2013 a Local Property Tax (LPT) was introduced, which has been compared to the reintroduction of domestic rates; one difference is that LPT is collected centrally by the Revenue Commissioners before being disbursed to the local authorities.

=== Israel ===
Israel has a similar tax known as arnona that goes back to the days of the British Mandate of Palestine. It is levied by the municipality (or, in smaller localities, by the Regional Council) based (currently) on the square meterage of dwelling or business. Specific rates vary widely among municipalities, with Jerusalem and Rehovot having the highest rates in the country. In rental dwellings, tenants (rather than owners) generally pay the arnona. Single parents and some forms of economic hardship qualify for discounts or even exemptions.

A persistent point of contention in the Israeli system is the lack of a uniform national standard for area measurement; while some municipalities bill based on 'net' living area, others utilize 'gross' measurements that include external walls and shared building facilities. The Ministry of Interior regulates annual rate adjustments to prevent excessive increases by local authorities. In addition to social welfare discounts, significant mandated reductions are granted to senior citizens and, increasingly, to IDF reserve soldiers as a gesture of national appreciation.

=== New Zealand ===
In New Zealand, rates have provided the major source of revenue for territorial authorities since the late-19th century. Rates are basically a tax on real property. For the year ended June 2005, rates made up 56% of local-authority operating-revenue.

Almost all property owners in New Zealand pay rates; those who do so are referred to as ratepayers. People who rent property do not pay rates directly, but property owners will take account of the cost of rates when they set the rent. As a result, those who rent properties also have an interest in the level of rates, as well as in the services provided by councils using these rates.

Some types of property are exempt from rate levies - government land and rail land, for example. Other categories of property may possibly only be rated at 50% (land used for some types of sports purposes). Māori land - particularly where ownership and therefore liability for rates are hard to establish - can also get special treatment. Exceptions are listed in Schedule 1 Part 1 of the Local Government (Rating) Act 2002.

Territorial authorities may assess property values in three different ways – on the basis of land, annual or capital value – using valuations prepared in accordance with the Rating Valuations Act 1998. The valuation process is overseen by the Valuer-General. Each local authority, after consulting with their community, can decide which basis to use.

Councils can use a mix of these different methodologies when assessing rates based on the value of holdings, for example land value for its general rate and capital value for a targeted rate.

Councils can also levy flat charges per rating unit (i.e. each lot of land, with some exceptions where multiple adjacent lots may be considered one rating unit if in common ownership, or where multiple dwelling-units are on a single lot) - generally called a uniform annual general charge. Other methodologies also exist, such as a charge per toilet bowl or urinal, or a water charge per cubic metre of water supplied.

The Local Government (Rating) Act 2002 is the governing legislation and provides a number of options for setting rates, such that local authorities can use combinations of general rates, targeted rates and/or uniform annual general charges.

=== Pakistan ===
In Pakistan, taxes have been applicable since its independence on August 14, 1947. Previously taken from the British Empire. However, Taxation in Pakistan was properly introduced by the Income Tax Ordinance 1979, on June 28 by Central Board of Revenue. Tax rates in Pakistan vary depending upon the types of income, source of income, and status of taxpayers. Generally, inactive taxpayers are taxed double, while in property transactions, the latter are taxed four times more.

In some cases, like tax on cash withdrawal, active taxpayers are not taxed. Similarly, for income tax in Pakistan, there is a slab system for individuals and AOPs, while the corporate sector is taxed at a fixed 29% for above 250m turnover annually. Small companies are, however, taxed at 20%.

Individuals and AOPs are exempt from taxes if their annual income is less than PKR 600,000 per year. Tax rates increase for high earners. In Pakistan, the tax slab starts at 5% for income above PKR 600,000 per year and stops at 45% for income above 5.6 million per year. Government of Pakistan tax rates reach up to 50% for high-yield profits known as Windfall tax.

=== South Africa ===
Rates in South Africa are a form of ongoing property tax for property owners, charged according to the Local Government: Municipal Property Rates Act No.6 of 2004, and are based on a property's present (at the time of billing), municipally-assessed value, which is updated each year. These values take into account any improvements made to buildings on the property, such as through renovations.

Property owners (for all types of properties, e.g., residential, commercial, and industrial, except those which are exempt) receive monthly rates accounts from their respective municipalities. These may be sent via post or, as is the case in the City of Cape Town, via email and via an online eServices platform.

==== Rates accounts ====
Rates bills include property tax, as well as fees for municipal water, sewerage, and refuse removal services. Services are charged according to the degree to which they are used. For example, the more water a property uses in a given month, the more it will be charged, and the rate per kiloliter of water used may increase as the property enters new tariff billing categories.

These bills, while not exclusive to just rates (property tax), as they include service fees, are commonly referred to in SA as municipal rates accounts, or simply "rates".

Electricity supply is not part of municipal rates bills. For those who receive electricity bills, these are issued separately, either directly by the municipality or by national power producer Eskom. Many South Africans have prepaid electricity meters installed in their homes by their respective municipalities, and if this is the case, they will load their own power as needed, instead of receiving monthly electricity bills.

The amount of prepaid electricity loaded each month appears on their municipal rates bill merely as information for the user. However, it also appears as the municipality is able to claw back unpaid rates from prepaid electricity values.

==== Calculating rates ====
As an example, in the case of the City of Cape Town - the local government that runs Cape Town (South Africa's second-largest city by population) - the following is taken into account for rates:

- The municipal property valuation
- A property's category in terms of what it's used for (zoning), and in some cases its ownership as well

A property is then charged rates according to a published Property Rates Tariff Sheet. Under South African law, a municipality is not allowed to levy rates on the first R15,000 of the value of a residential property. This value is as it appears on the General Valuation Roll (the most current version of which is GV2022).

Property categories include:

- Nature conservation land
- Residential
- Agricultural
- Commercial
- Industrial
- Mining
- Properties owned by a social housing authority
- Government-owned properties used for the provision of public services
- Nonprofit properties
- Public Benefit Organisation (PBO) properties
- Public Service Infrastructure properties
- Vacant land

==== Rates during property sales ====
When a property is sold, during the transfer process, the municipality is informed that it will be shifted to a new owner. As such, the municipality will begin billing the new owner once transfer has completed. As part of standard South African property sales practices, the existing owner will prepay a certain number of months of rates, which will then be credited back to them, as applicable, after the new owner begins paying the rates account. The municipality calculates and credits this as standard.

=== United Kingdom ===
Rates in the United Kingdom are a tax on property used to provide some of the funding of local government.

Domestic rates, split into regional and district rates, are currently collected in Northern Ireland. They were collected in England and Wales before 1990 and in Scotland before 1989. Outside Northern Ireland Council Tax is collected instead of domestic rates.

Business rates are collected throughout the United Kingdom, with different systems in England, in Wales, in Northern Ireland and in Scotland.

=== United States ===
In the US, real estate taxes which are based on a percentage of the property's actual or nominal value are referred to as "property taxes". The term "rates" is not used in this context. Property taxes are the prime funding method for local government (i.e., counties, cities, townships, etc.), and are normally paid by the property owner, regardless of whether the property owner lives on the property.

== See also ==
- Property tax
- Tax bracket, for income and not for property value

== Sources ==
Books

- Dobson, Alban; Hull, Hubert (1931). The Land Drainage Act 1930. Oxford University Press.
