= Watercare Services =

Council-controlled water services provider in Auckland

Watercare Services Limited
- Type: Council-controlled organisation
- Industry: Water industry; Public works
- Founded: 21 August 1991
- Headquarters: Auckland, New Zealand
- Area served: Auckland excluding Papakura
- Key people: Jamie Sinclair, Chief Executive
- Services: Drinking water; Wastewater
- Owners: Auckland Council
- Number of employees: 984 (2019)
- Website: https://www.watercare.co.nz/

Watercare Services (Watercare) is an infrastructure asset management council-controlled organisation (CCO) that manages the drinking water and wastewater services of the Auckland Region of New Zealand. Watercare is registered with the New Zealand Companies Office as Watercare Services Limited, and is 100% owned by Auckland Council.

== Establishment ==
Watercare Services Ltd was first incorporated in August 1991, and formed as a local-authority trading enterprise in 1992. The drinking water services provider Metrowater, founded in 1997, was integrated into Watercare in 2010. Watercare became a council-controlled organisation under the Local Government Act 2002 on 1 July 2012. Watercare provides services to properties across the Auckland region with the exception of Papakura, where Veolia Water retails water and wastewater services to homes and businesses under a franchise agreement.

== Operating model ==
On 28 January 2020, the Minister of Local Government, Hon Nanaia Mahuta, released Cabinet papers and minutes setting out intentions for reform of service delivery and funding arrangements for the three waters services nationwide. The Cabinet paper referred to two key challenges of affordability and capability that are facing New Zealand's three waters service delivery. There was specific reference in the Cabinet paper to Watercare as an example of one approach to service delivery that had successfully built capability through the scale of its operations. The paper also noted advantages of the Watercare operating model compared with other jurisdictions, in relation to investment planning and trade-offs between capital and operating expenditure.

== Key people ==
Raveen Jaduram was chief executive for six years, but resigned in October 2020, amidst controversy about his salary.

In March 2021, Watercare announced that Jon Lamonte, previously chief executive of Sydney Metro, had been appointed as the new chief executive.

== Significant projects ==
=== Central interceptor ===
Watercare is building a large main trunk sewer between Western Springs, near Auckland Zoo, and the Māngere wastewater treatment plant. The commissioning of the Central interceptor is expected to bring an 80% reduction in the incidents of sewage pollution of the inner city beaches and waterways that currently occur during wet weather overflows. The project is estimated to cost approximately $1.2 billion, and is the largest wastewater project in the history of the organisation.

== See also ==
- Water supply and sanitation in New Zealand
- Infrastructure asset management
- Water supply network
- Wastewater
