= Water supply and sanitation in the Wellington Region =

Water supply and sanitation in the Wellington region involves the provision of the "three waters" – drinking water, stormwater, and wastewater services in the Greater Wellington region.

Water supplies to the Wellington metropolitan area meet the requirements of the Health Act and comply with drinking water standards. However, for some of the towns in the Kāpiti Coast and Wairarapa regions, there has been occasional non-compliance with the required standards for drinking water quality and safety. The challenges for managing the three waters in the Wellington region include the deteriorated condition of the city reticulation pipelines, in Porirua, Lower Hutt, Upper Hutt and Wellington City. The pipelines are in significantly worse condition than those in other large networks nationwide, and there has been a recent history of serious failures. The water supply to the region is also at significant risk because of the high rate of leakage, and it is also vulnerable during a severe earthquake, although some projects are underway to improve resilience.

There is also a history of significant failures at wastewater treatment plants in the region, including the complete failure of the Moa Point plant on 4 February 2026, leading to an extended period of discharge of untreated sewage on Wellington's south coast.

== Asset ownership and service provision ==
The three waters assets in the Wellington metropolitan area are owned by five councils: Wellington City, Hutt, Upper Hutt and Porirua city councils, and the Greater Wellington Regional Council. The water assets of these councils became managed by an infrastructure asset management company, Wellington Water. From 1 October 2019, Wellington Water also became the asset manager of the water assets of the South Wairarapa District Council.

Wellington Water is jointly owned by all six councils.

The assets in the region covered by these six councils includes 6,300 km of pipes, 138 reservoirs, 249 pump stations and four drinking water treatment plants.

Three waters services for the remaining parts of the Greater Wellington region are provided by the Kāpiti Coast District Council, the Carterton District Council and Masterton District Council.

== Asset management and investment planning ==
Benchmarking data published by Water New Zealand as part of their 2018/19 National Performance Review showed that capital expenditure on three waters assets in the Wellington region is well below the average of the expenditure on networks in most other major centres, and for the wastewater network, expenditure was the lowest out of the seven large networks in the review.

=== Wellington region ===
In 2024, a Wellington Regional Councillor expressed the view that the deterioration of the three waters city reticulation infrastructure had reached a state of "network fault runaway", where there was more expenditure on repairs than planned replacements. The councillor forecast that as a consequence of 50 years of under-investment, it would be necessary for annual household rates for the three waters services to rise over the next ten years from around $1,711 to between $3,000 and $4,000. Former Wellington mayor Kerry Prendergast, claimed that "no council in the region has enough in their long term plans".

=== Wellington city ===
Approximately 200 kilometres of the city's pipes were laid before the outbreak of World War I, and more than half of all the city's pipes will need replacing in the coming three decades. $578 million is required to fix a backlog of existing issues as at 2020. The forecast costs for new investment just to cope with expected population growth range from $2 billion to $4.5 billion.

In a comment about the asset management challenges for the three waters nationwide in February 2020, Water New Zealand’s Technical Manager, Noel Roberts said that problems with wastewater assets in Wellington are not unique to the capital city. He noted that each household in Wellington currently pays $459 a year on wastewater but this is below the national average of $492 per year. Spending on wastewater in Wellington has lagged behind investment in drinking water, particularly with the city’s recent focus on improving resilience.

Wellington city councillors commented at about the same time that the city was already spending a third of its annual budget on water systems. Councillor Sean Rush said that prioritisation of expenditure had to change from age-based replacement to where the consequences of failure would be the worst.

In May 2021, the Wellington City Council approved a 10 year plan that included expenditure of $2.7 billion on water pipe maintenance and upgrades in Wellington city, and an additional $147 to $208 million for plant upgrades at the Moa Point wastewater treatment plant.

In June 2021, a report released by Wellington Water gave estimates for investments in water infrastructure that could be required to meet forecast population growth to 2050. The report indicated that total new investment for growth could reach $3.6 billion. The estimated cost of upgrade per new dwelling varied widely across the region, from $70,000 to $520,000.

=== Lower Hutt ===
Long term estimates prepared in 2020 for the water infrastructure in Lower Hutt indicated that expenditure of $1.3 billion was required over 30 years to deal with ageing infrastructure. By 2024, Hutt City Council had allocated $1.6 billion in its ten year plan, and was planning a 16.9% rates increase to fund the investment in three waters infrastructure. A report to the council identified 23 major risks associated with the poor condition of assets, the growing backlog of renewals, the risks to water supply security and safety caused by leaks, and the risks of overflows of wastewater caused by deterioration in pipelines.

=== Porirua ===
In 2021, it was forecast that Porirua city may require investment of $1.8 billion over 30 years.

== Drinking water ==
=== Regional water supply networks ===
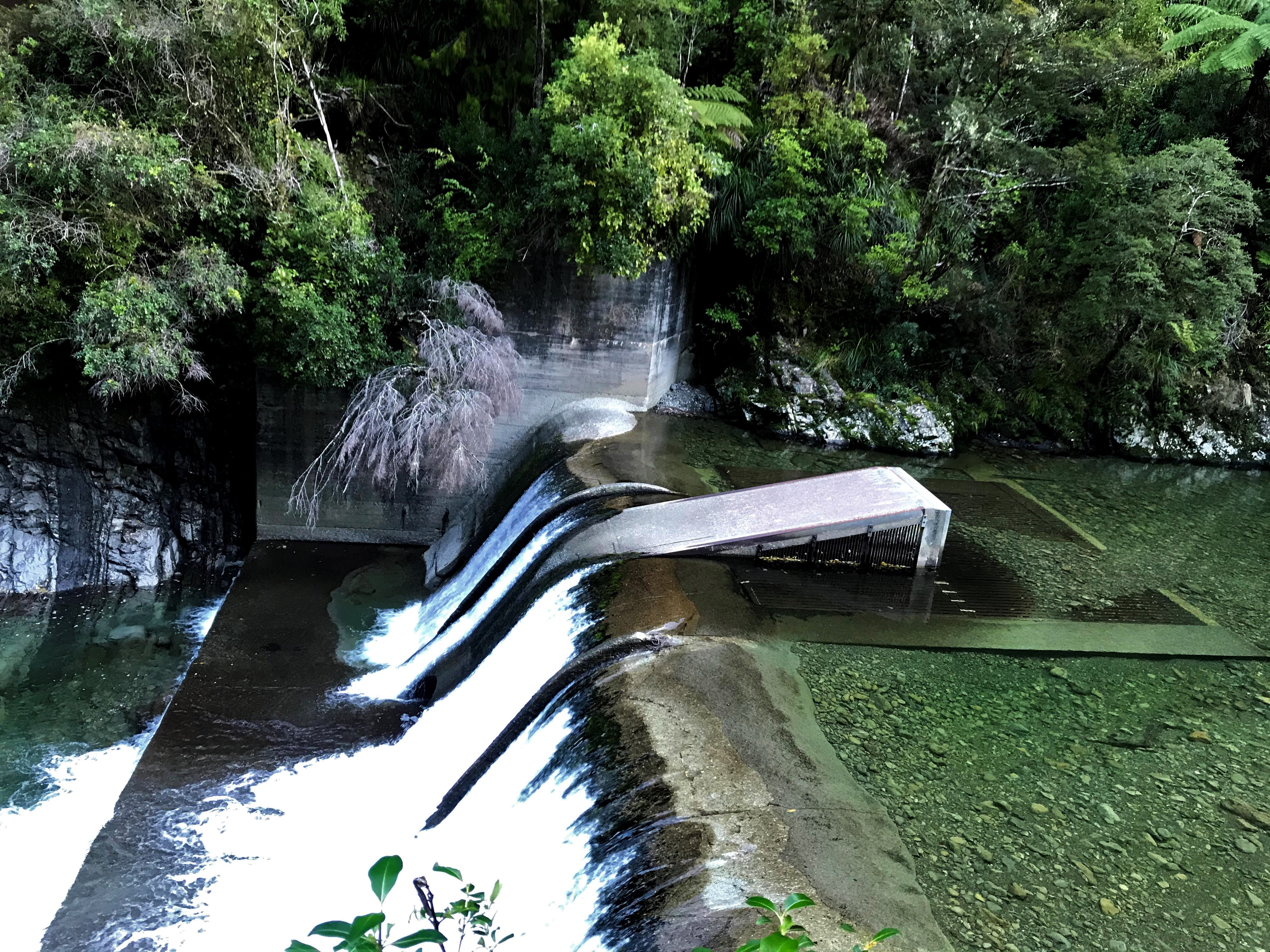
Weir and water supply intake on Hutt River at Kaitoke

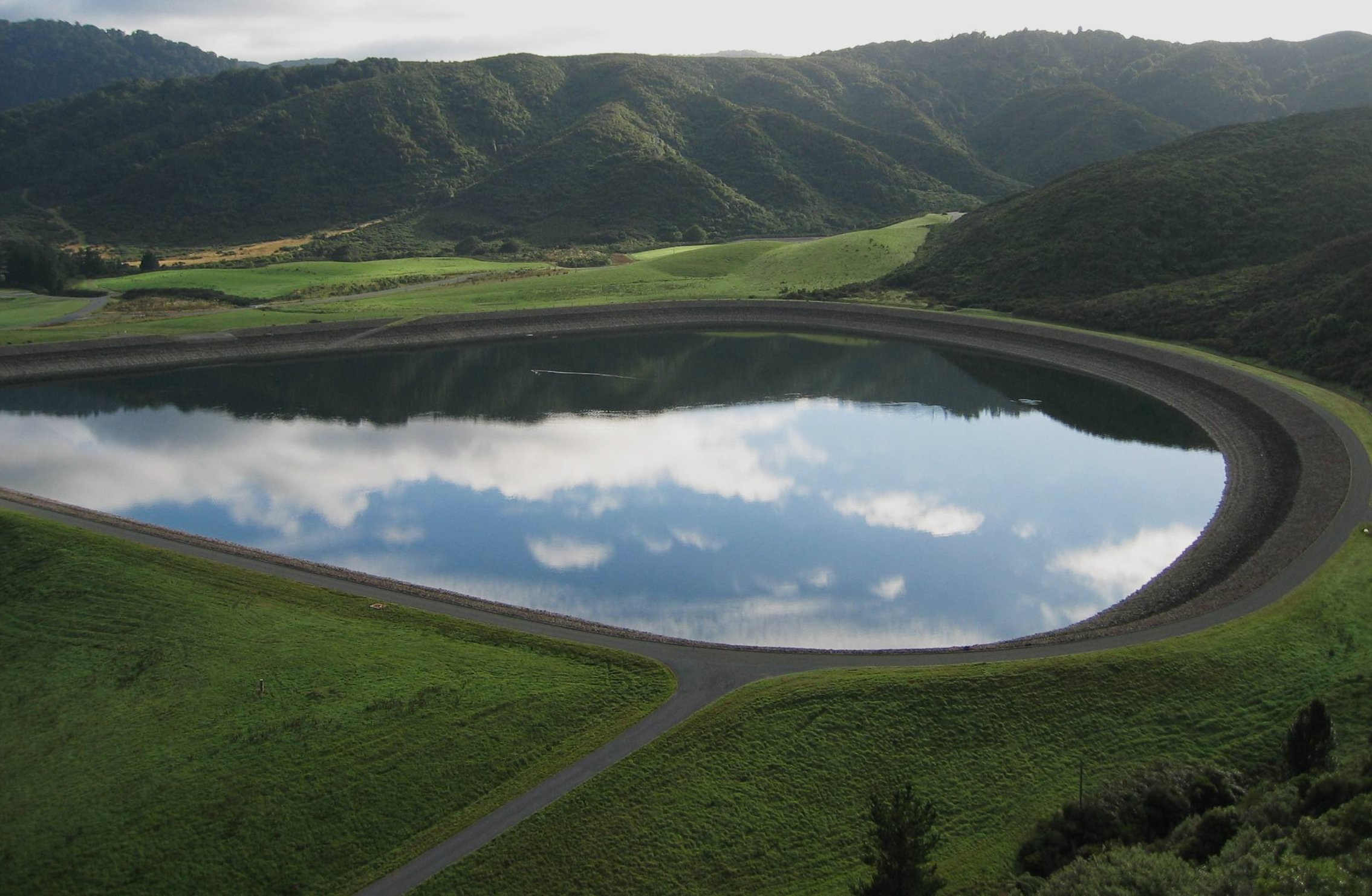
Upper Macaskill lake

The supply of reticulated drinking water is regulated under the Health Act, and suppliers are registered and subject to a testing regime. The main registered water suppliers for the Greater Wellington region are Greater Wellington Regional Council, Wellington City Council, Porirua City Council, Hutt City Council, Upper Hutt City Council, Kāpiti Coast District Council. Masterton District Council, Carterton District Council and South Wairarapa District Council.

=== Water sources for Wellington metropolitan area ===
Water supply for the Wellington metropolitan area comes from three sources:

- Te Awa Kairangi / Hutt River
- Wainuiomata and Ōrongorongo rivers
- Waiwhetu Aquifer

Up to 150 million litres of water per day may be diverted from the Hutt River, provided an adequate flow is maintained downstream of the weir. The Hutt river water supply provides about 40 percent of the water used in the Wellington metropolitan area each year. There are times each year, particularly during summer months, where the total demand is greater than can be supplied from the three sources. There are two large storage lakes at Te Marua Treatment Plant that can be used to supplement the supply during these periods.

=== Water sources for remaining areas ===
The water sources for the South Wairarapa District Council area are the Waiohine catchment for Featherston, the Kuratawhiti Street bore for Greytown residents, and the Herricks bore field for users in Martinborough. Water supplies for the Kāpiti Coast region are sourced from combination of bores and surface water from the Waikanae River. Water supply for the Carterton district comes from the Kaipatangata stream and two underground bores. Masterton's drinking water is sourced from the Waingawa River, about 10 km west of Masterton.

=== Water treatment ===
The reticulated water supply to the Wellington metropolitan area is from 2017, all chlorinated. Drinking water in Lower Hutt, Porirua, Upper Hutt and Wellington city is also fluoridated. The only exceptions are Petone and Korokoro. These suburbs historically had an unfluoridated water supply and this has continued following a public survey in 2000. There are four water treatment plants located in the Hutt Valley (Te Mārua, Waterloo, Gear Island and Wainuiomata). These plants supply water for use in Upper Hutt, Lower Hutt, Porirua and Wellington cities. The treatment processes at the four treatment plants differ based on the characteristics of the incoming water. The Gear Island and Waterloo plants both treat water that is drawn from the Waiwhetu aquifer.

=== Water supply pipeline age and condition ===
The 2018/19 National Performance Review published by Water New Zealand compares the average city reticulation pipeline age and condition across water supply networks. The data for the Wellington water supply network shows that 20% of the pipelines are in poor or very poor condition. The Wellington network ranks the worst on this measure out of the six large supply networks nationwide. The review also includes average pipeline age. The Wellington network has an average age of 43 years, and ranks as the second oldest of the six large supply networks.

=== Consumption, losses and metering ===
A National Performance Review published by Water New Zealand for the 2019 financial year showed that daily residential consumption in the Wellington metropolitan region was about 226 litres per person. By way of comparison, daily residential water use in Auckland and Tauranga was significantly lower at about 156 and 189 litres per person respectively. Both Auckland and Tauranga have water metering in place for all residences, but in Wellington only around 1% of residential supplies are currently metered.

==== Losses ====
In 2023 Wellington Water reported that around 44% of the region's treated water supply is lost through leaks. For Upper Hutt city, Wellington Water reported that 52% of the drinking water supplied was being lost through leaks. An Upper Hutt councillor claimed that the state of the water network in the city was the result of decades of under-investment, and that the city was currently only replacing 1.5 km (0.93 mi) of water mains each year. The Upper Hutt mayor Wayne Guppy disputed the claims and said that he had "no confidence" in Wellington Water and its advice.

==== Water meters ====
In March 2020, it was reported that Wellington City Council was considering installing water meters for all domestic consumers. At the time of that report, only 1,200 residential properties in Wellington were using water meters.

In December 2017, the Kāpiti Coast District Council reported that there had been a drop in consumption of more than 26% since water meters were installed in July 2014.

Porirua City Council in its domestic "corporation" stop cocks, known as Tobies, replacement programme, commencing around 1998, installed new manifolds which can be retrofitted with insertion water meters, but at the inauguration of the scheme did not fit meters as it was considered not politic. Similarly, their in-house maintenance workers also fitted these manifolds when replacing failed stopcocks for residents. Not all properties have meters installed.

=== Quality and safety ===
Drinking water is subject to a regime of testing under the Health Act to verify that the water meets standards. Results of compliance testing are published by the Ministry of Health.

==== Waiwhetu aquifer ====
Up until late 2016, bores in the Waterloo well field were considered to be secure. However, a rising trend in bacterial count and E.coli detections triggered a review. At that stage, about half the customers supplied from the Waterloo treatment station received unchlorinated water.

During 2016 and 2017, water supply businesses throughout New Zealand became aware of the severe public health consequences of the Havelock North drinking water contamination incident and the subsequent Government inquiry that recommended all drinking water supplies should be chlorinated.

In 2017, a decision was made by Greater Wellington Regional Council to chlorinate all the water drawn from the Waiwhetu aquifer.

==== Martinborough ====
There were two periods during early 2019 when a "boil water" notice was issued to the residents of Martinborough.

==== Carterton ====
During March and April 2021, the Carterton District Council issued three separate "boil-water" notices, following the discovery of low levels of E.coli in the town's drinking water.

=== Resilience ===
==== Wellington metropolitan area ====
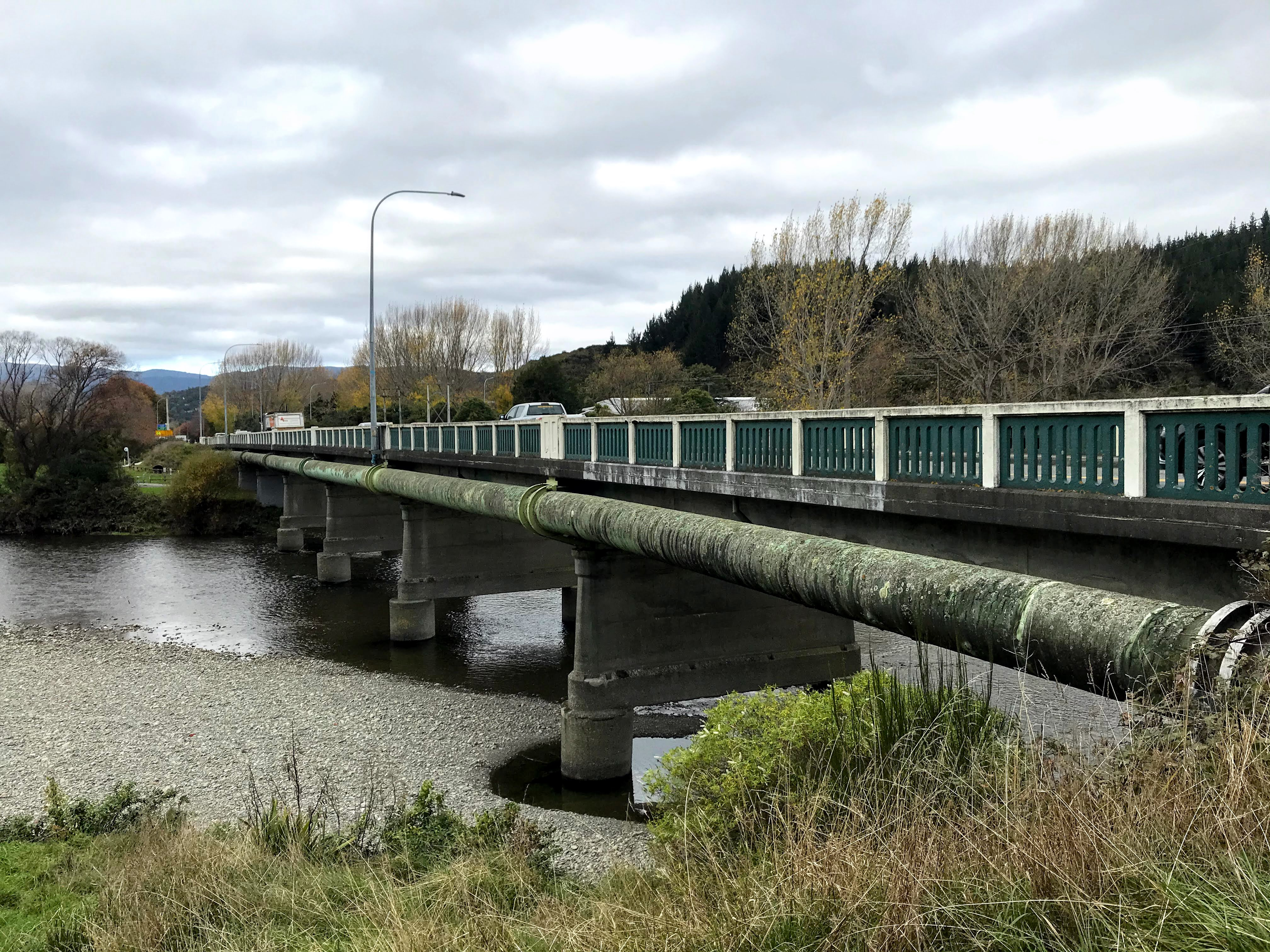
Bulk water supply pipeline across Hutt River at Silverstream Bridge

The supply of water to the Wellington region is potentially vulnerable to significant disruption in the event of failures caused by a major earthquake.

An application in 2017 by Wellington Water for an easement for a storage reservoir referenced a 2009 study conducted by GNS Science of possible earthquake damage to the water network. This study estimated that for a magnitude 7.5 Richter scale earthquake, there would be about 30 breaks on the bulk water (main trunk) pipelines and 60 breaks on the smaller branch lines. There could be as many as 8,000 breaks in the Wellington City local supply network. Bulk water supply and treatment facilities are also expected to suffer damage requiring repair. Wellington Water and Greater Wellington Regional Council estimated that it would take around 60‐70 days to restore bulk water supply to parts of the Wellington metropolitan area. It could take several years to fully repair damage to the local water distribution network resulting from a severe earthquake, as much of the network may have to be rebuilt.

A wide range of projects are being undertaken to improve resilience, including the construction of additional reservoirs.

== Stormwater ==
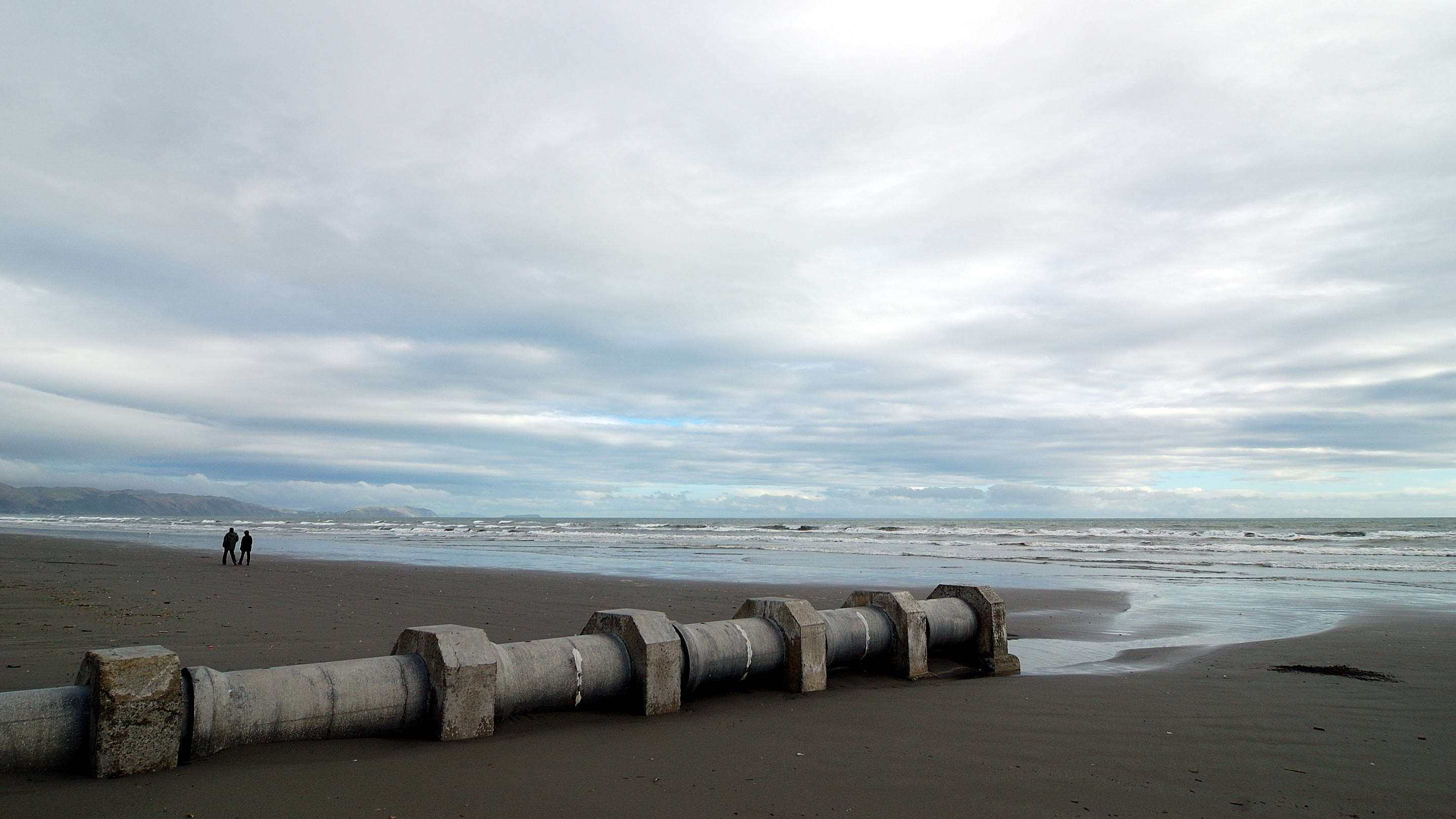
Ocean outfall at Paraparaumu Beach

=== Stormwater pipeline age and condition ===
The 2018/19 National Performance Review published by Water New Zealand compares the average stormwater pipeline age and condition across networks. The data for the Wellington Water network shows that 16% of the pipelines are in poor or very poor condition. The Wellington stormwater network ranks the worst on this measure out of the six large networks nationwide.

The review also includes average pipeline age. The Wellington stormwater network has an average age of 49 years, and ranks as the second oldest of the six large networks.

=== Porirua stormwater improvements ===
In June 2020, the Porirua City Council announced that work was underway to increase the resilience and capacity of the local stormwater network. The scope includes the creation of a new wetland.

== Wastewater ==
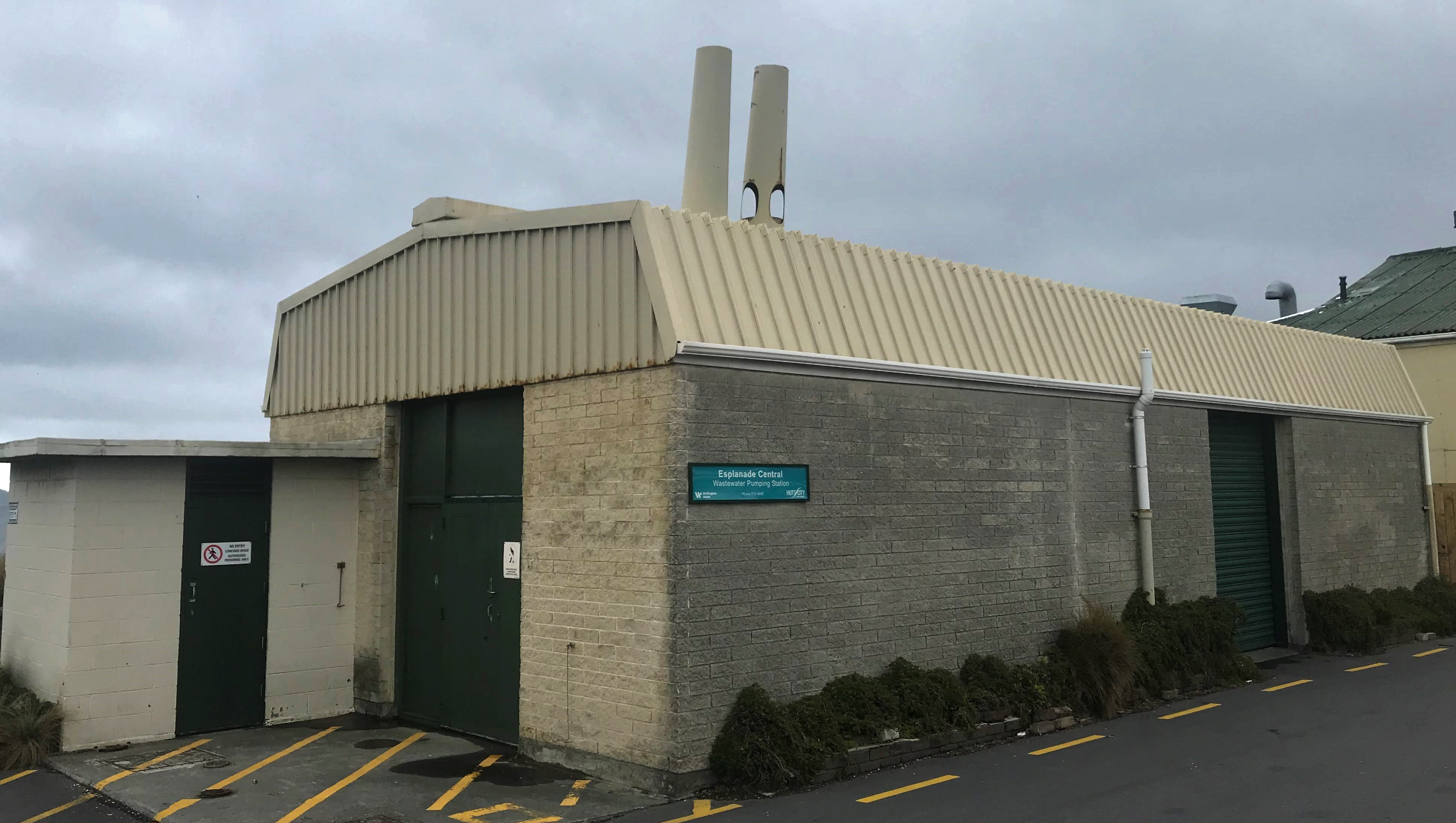
Petone Esplanade Central - Wastewater Pumping Station

=== Wellington city catchment ===
Properties in urban areas in the Wellington Region are generally all connected to a wastewater system via a gravity sewer. Pumps are used to supplement the gravity sewers, by pumping wastewater to a treatment plant, or lifting wastewater from lower level drains into a higher elevation gravity sewer so that it can flow to a treatment plant.

After Wellington became the capital city in 1865, the population grew quickly. Cases of typhoid and cholera emerged that were attributed to poor city sanitation. In 1879 there were 75 deaths in Wellington from typhoid, diphtheria, scarlet fever, measles and cholera – mostly in the central Te Aro area. In 1893, construction started on a city wastewater network. It was completed by 1899 at a cost of £175,000.

There are four separate wastewater catchments in the Wellington metropolitan area:

- Wellington city (extending as far north as Johnsonville)
- Porirua (from northern Johnsonville to Pukerua Bay)
- Karori
- Hutt Valley

The catchments drain mostly via gravity, but there are approximately 170 wastewater pumping stations.

==== Wastewater treatment ====
There are four wastewater treatment plants in the Wellington metropolitan area, one for each of the catchments.

| Catchment | Treatment plant location |
|---|---|
| Wellington city | Moa Point |
| Porirua | Titahi Bay |
| Karori | Western Karori |
| Hutt valley | Seaview |

When wastewater networks were first installed, they generally discharged untreated wastewater to the coastal marine environment. Treatment of wastewater in the Wellington metropolitan area began with the installation of fine screening at Seaview and Moa Point in the 1980s. The discharge of untreated sewage at Moa Point became an election issue in the 1986 local government elections in Wellington City. Jim Belich campaigned with a promise to end the discharge of untreated sewage at Moa Point. He was elected as mayor of Wellington, despite having no previous experience as an elected official and was re-elected in 1989. A secondary treatment plant for the Porirua catchment was constructed at Titahi Bay in the late 1980s. Secondary treatment was installed at Moa Point, Seaview and the Western plants between 1996 and 2002.

Together, the four treatment plants treat about 150 million litres of wastewater on a typical day, using biological and ultraviolet treatment processes. The treated water is discharged to the sea. The sludge resulting from filtration and treatment is de-watered (with this water further treated) and the solid content is sent to landfills.

There are also wastewater treatment plants at Featherston, Greytown, Martinborough and Lake Ferry.

===== Moa Point treatment plant =====
The Moa Point treatment plant handles all the wastewater from most of Wellington city, other than Karori and some northern suburbs. In 1995 Wellington City Council contracted British company Anglian Water International to provide a sewage treatment plant for Wellington at Moa Point, at a cost of $149 million. The facility opened officially in September 1998. The treatment process has several steps: liquid is screened to remove solids, then goes through settling tanks. After treatment with an agent to separate out bacteria, the liquid is treated with ultraviolet light to eliminate most remaining bacteria and viruses. The treated water is then discharged to the ocean in Cook Strait via a 1.8-kilometre-long (1.1 mi) marine outfall pipe. Sludge is separated from the wastewater at the plant, and pumped at high pressure over a 9 kilometres (5.6 mi) route from Moa Point to the landfill at Carey’s Gully, where it is dewatered and placed into a landfill.

The plant can discharge up to 260,000 cubic metres of wastewater per day. During periods of heavy rainfall the volume of wastewater coming in sometimes gets too high and the plant may need to discharge partly treated sewage into the ocean. If this happens warning notices are displayed at Moa Point and Lyall Bay and are notified online.

In November 2021, Wellington City Council announced that it was considering installing a new technology thermal drying plant at Moa Point to treat sewage sludge. The benefits of this project would be to eliminate the current process of pumping sewage sludge from Moa Point to the landfill at Carey’s Gully, and reduce the amount of sludge going into the landfill by 80%. The original estimated project cost was in the range $160m – $220m. The funding of the project was proposed to come from additional levies on residential and commercial properties. The construction proceeded, but by August 2025, the estimated final cost had risen to over $500 million.

====== 2026 plant failure ======
On 4 February 2026, there was a complete failure of the Moa Point treatment plant when wastewater backed up and flooded the facility. Wellington Water stated that the plant would be out of service for an extended period and that it could take months to repair. Around 70 million litres per day of untreated sewage was discharged into a short ocean outfall at Tarakena Bay. The public were warned to stay away from beaches on the Wellington south coast. Wellington mayor Andrew Little described the failure as an environmental disaster. On 6 February, Wellington Water advised that they had been able to divert wastewater flows into the 1.8 km (1.1 mi) ocean outfall pipe into Cook Strait, and provide milliscreening. The capacity was limited to 900 litres per second, and inflows beyond this level would be discharged at Tarakena Bay. The risk to public health on the south coast remained. Little and Government ministers, including Prime Minister Christopher Luxon and Local Government Minister Simon Watts, have agreed that an independent inquiry into the plant's failure is needed.

In early October 2026, the Greater Wellington Regional Council filed criminal charges against both water services company Tiaki Wai and the Wellington City Council over their handling of the Moa Point wastewater spillage. As the successor to Wellington Water, Tiaki Wai inherited its predecessor's responsibilities and liabilities.

=== Wastewater pipeline age and condition ===
The 2018/19 National Performance Review published by Water New Zealand compares the average wastewater pipeline age and condition across networks. The data for the Wellington Water network shows that 33% of the pipelines are in poor or very poor condition. The Wellington wastewater network ranks the worst on this measure out of the six large networks nationwide. (The next worst is Christchurch, with only 12% in poor or very poor condition). The review also includes average pipeline age. The Wellington wastewater network has an average age of 53 years, and ranks as the second oldest of the six large networks.

==== The interceptor ====
As part of the early development of the wastewater network, a large pipe was constructed to carry wastewater from Manners St in the central city, through Mount Victoria and out to an ocean outfall at Moa Point on the south coast. This main trunk wastewater line, known as "the interceptor", was extended through to Pipitea St as the city's population reached 100,000. As suburban development spread north to Johnsonville, a further extension of the interceptor was constructed from Ngauranga Gorge and through the Ngaio Gorge to connect at Thorndon.

==== Performance - Wellington catchment ====
In March 2020, Wellington Water reported the discovery of severe corrosion in the large main trunk sewer (the interceptor) over a length of 250 m in a section close to the treatment plant near Moa Point. Work commenced on re-lining the affected section of the interceptor in April.

===== Failure of sludge pipeline beneath Mt Albert =====
In January 2020, there was a failure of pipelines carrying sludge pumped at high pressure from the Moa Point treatment plant to the landfill at Carey’s Gully. The pipelines are 9 km long and are about 25 years old. There are two in parallel allowing one to operate while maintenance can occur on the other pipe. In this incident both pipes failed at the same time.

To avoid discharging the sludge into the ocean, a fleet of sewage trucks was mobilized to carry about one million litres of sludge a day to the dewatering plant at Carey’s Gully. Up to 150 round trips each day were required, with trucks sometimes operating around the clock to keep up with the volume. Some local residents were impacted by the increased heavy traffic and smells from the trucks.

The break in the pipelines was located 200 m inside a sewage tunnel beneath Mt Albert, making repairs a significant challenge. The repair solution required the manufacture in Germany of a custom-made polyester woven liner. This liner was winched from one end of each pipe to the other, and then expanded to essentially act as a new pipeline within the old one. Specialists from the manufacturer flew to New Zealand to assist in the installation, but were required to spend 14 days in isolation because of the border restrictions imposed in response to the COVID-19 pandemic.

In April, Wellington City Council agreed to borrow $16 million to fund repairs to the sludge pipelines, together with the on-going costs of transporting sludge via truck from the Moa Point treatment facility to the landfill site while the repairs were carried out. On 24 May, Wellington Water announced that the first of the two sludge pipelines had been repaired and put into service, allowing the sludge trucking operations to end.

=== Porirua catchment ===
Wastewater from the northern suburbs of Wellington and from Porirua city as far north as Pukerua Bay is treated at a wastewater treatment plant (WWTP) located at Rukutane Point to the south-west of Titahi Bay beach. There is an ocean outfall adjacent to the plant. The WWTP was officially opened in September 1989, ending the continuous discharge of untreated wastewater that had occurred at Rukutane Point since the sewage network was constructed in 1951.

The catchment area includes pipe networks owned by Wellington City Council in northern Johnsonville, Paparangi, northern Newlands, Woodridge, Grenada, Churton Park and Tawa. Sewage mains from the boundary between Wellington and Porirua City Council areas to the treatment plant are jointly owned by the two councils.

==== Performance - Porirua catchment ====
As part of a submission to a Porirua City Council committee in 2018 in relation to renewing resource consents, Wellington Water provided a background document about the issues in the Porirua wastewater system. The issues reported included:

- poor existing freshwater quality in the Porirua catchment
- frequent overflows from wastewater networks into freshwater and coastal water during periods of wet weather, and overflows from the wastewater treatment plant into coastal water
- inflow and infiltration from stormwater into the wastewater network
- ageing network prone to failures and with insufficient capacity to accommodate future growth
- insufficient capacity of the treatment plant to accommodate future growth

===== Wastewater network overflows during storms =====
Discharges from the wastewater network can occur from multiple overflow points in the network. There are 20 overflow points built into the network. Discharge of untreated sewage from these overflow points occurs when the total flow exceeds the capacity of pipes and pumping stations, typically during periods of heavy rain or where there is large amounts of infiltration from groundwater. Wastewater overflows also occur from manholes in some cases. These discharges cause pollution of waterways, harbour, and beaches, and create public health hazards.

=== Karori catchment ===
A separate wastewater and treatment system serves the Karori (western) area. Treated wastewater is piped out to the South Coast.

=== Hutt Valley catchment ===
Prior to 2001, wastewater from the entire Hutt Valley was screened and then pumped without any further treatment via a 18.3 km (11.4 mi) pipeline to an ocean outfall near the harbour entrance at Pencarrow Head. The outfall pipeline is a re-inforced concrete rising main. It was commissioned in 1962, but has had a history of problems with joints failing. The route of the pipeline passes through the industrial area of Seaview, then beneath the narrow road that serves the communities of Lowry Bay, Days Bay and Eastbourne for 8 km (5.0 mi), and then along an unsealed road that was initially built for the construction of the pipeline. From Eastbourne it follows the eastern side of Wellington Harbour for 8 km (5.0 mi) to a short ocean outfall south of Pencarrow Head.

==== Treatment plant ====
By the 1990s, the discharge of untreated sewage into the ocean had become environmentally unacceptable. Planning for a new sewage treatment plan began in the mid 1990s. In 1997, the Wainuiomata community was consulted over future options for their wastewater treatment, because the existing Wainuiomata plant was not able to comply with the emerging standards for discharge of effluent to the Wainuiomata River. One of the options was to connect Wainuiomata to the Hutt Valley wastewater treatment system that was in the planning stage at that time.

In 1998, tenders were called for a design, build and operate contract for a treatment plant to be built in Seaview that would provide secondary treatment of all sewage from the Hutt Valley and Wainuiomata. A contract was let in 1999, and the plant was commissioned in 2001 at a cost of $63 million. Wastewater from the Wainuiomata area is piped to the Hutt Valley through the Wainuiomata Tunnel, an abandoned road tunnel that was converted in 1980 to a utilities tunnel. In preparation for the commissioning of the new plant, some companies in the Hutt Valley had to make major reductions in their discharges of trade waste. In one case, a fish meal factory was discharging as much waste into the network as the combined waste from Wainuiomata and Upper Hutt.

In the period from 2021 to 2023 there were 111 complaints about a stench from the Seaview wastewater treatment plant affecting homes and businesses in the Seaview, Hutt Park and Gracefield area. The Greater Wellington Regional Council issued infringement notices and fines to Hutt City and Upper Hutt City Councils, Wellington Water and the plant operator Veolia for breach of consent conditions and abatement notices for “discharge of objectionable and offensive odour”. Wellington Water stated that a filter intended to reduce odours was being replaced.

==== Problems with the main outfall ====
In March 2022, Wellington Water reported a leak in the pipeline to the outfall, in the Seaview area. Repairs required the shutdown of the pipeline, and treated wastewater was discharged into the Waiwhetū Stream while the repairs were carried out. In September 2023, Wellington Water briefed the Upper Hutt and Lower Hutt City Councils about problems with the existing 18 km (11 mi) outfall pipe from Seaview to Pencarrow. The reported issues included unreliability of rubber joints in the pipeline, leading to the need to reduce operating pressure to reduce the risk of joints failing. When joints need to be repaired, the pipeline must be shutdown, and treated wastewater discharged into the Waiwhetū Stream while the repair is completed. It was forecast that pipeline shutdowns for repairs will become increasingly frequent, possibly rising to 30 times per year, with a typical repair time of 1 week. Wellington Water advised that the existing pipeline could be relined to allow it to operate at higher pressure, but that this would require discharge of treated sewage via a temporary outfall for an extended period. This option would not meet the needs of forecast increasing population in the Hutt Valley. Another option was a new pipeline in Wellington Harbour. The forecast costs of a new outfall pipeline were approximately $700 million, with a further $300 million required for upgrades to the treatment plant, including a replacement sludge drier.

=== South Wairarapa ===
As at May 2022, the wastewater treatment plans serving Featherston, Greytown and Martinborough were all non-compliant, and in need of major investment.

==== Featherston ====
The underground wastewater pipe network in Featherston has significant issues with infiltration of stormwater, and this leads to pollution when there are overflows at the treatment plant. As at 2022, the wastewater scheme for Featherston discharges UV-treated wastewater to Donald's Creek and Lake Wairarapa and is operating under the terms of an extension to an expired resource consent. Lake Wairarapa is part of the Wairarapa Moana Wetlands, recognised in August 2020 as a wetland of international significance under the Ramsar Convention.

As part of efforts to reduce pollution of Lake Wairarapa caused by discharge of wastewater, the South Wairarapa District Council (SWDC) has been exploring alternative options. In 2017, the Council applied to the Greater Wellington Regional Council for resource consent for an alternative including disposal of treated wastewater to land, using irrigation. The council also purchased two plots of land, Hodders Farm and Featherston Golf Course, covering a total of 200 hectares (490 acres), as future sites for land-based discharge of treated wastewater. However, the plan was strongly opposed by some community groups, and in 2020 the SWDC decided not to proceed with the consent application. In 2022, short-listed options for a long-term solution for wastewater disposal were reported to range in cost from $30 million to $215 million.

==== Martinborough ====
The Martinborough wastewater plant usually discharges treated effluent to land using irrigation, but can also discharge to the Ruamāhanga River. Almost half a million litres of partially and fully treated wastewater was discharged into the Ruamāhanga River in two incidents in January 2020, as a result of issues at the treatment plant. Under suitable conditions, discharging fully treated wastewater to the river is a consented activity. However, when the river level is low, as in this case, this type of discharge is a breach of the resource consent.

A report issued in 2022 stated that the design of the scheme was insufficient to achieve compliance requirements, with breaches of consent conditions relating to the rate and quality of effluent discharge to both land and water. In May 2023, the South Wairarapa District Council announced a sudden halt on new connections to the sewage network, because the existing treatment plan was at the limits of its design capacity. The decision was expected to delay housing development in the town by two years.

==== Greytown ====
The wastewater scheme is designed to discharge to land and to surface water. A report issued in 2022 stated that the scheme was insufficient to meet compliance requirements.

==== Lake Ferry ====
In July 2020, the wastewater system serving the settlement was damaged during forestry operations, and residents were required to restrict wastewater for two days. The system uses discharge to a field. No discharge to waterways was reported. The estimated cost of repairs was $327,000.

== See also ==
- Water supply and sanitation in New Zealand
- Water in New Zealand
- Wainuiomata River
- Birchville Dam
- Zealandia - former water catchment and reservoirs
- Tiaki Wai
