= Wellington Water =

New Zealand infrastructure asset management company

- Industry: Water industry; Public works
- Predecessor: Capacity Infrastructure Services
- Founded: July 2003
- Defunct: July 1, 2026
- Successor: Tiaki Wai
- Headquarters: Wellington, New Zealand
- Key people: Bill Bayfield–Acting chair; Pat Dougherty–Chief Executive
- Services: Drinking water; Wastewater; Stormwater
- Owners: Hutt, Porirua, Upper Hutt and Wellington city councils, South Wairarapa District Council and Greater Wellington Regional Council.
- Website: www.wellingtonwater.co.nz

Wellington Water Limited was an infrastructure asset management company that managed the drinking water, wastewater and stormwater services of five councils in the Wellington Region of New Zealand. It existed between July 2003 and 30 June 2026 and was succeeded by Tiaki Wai.

== Ownership and governance ==
The company was first incorporated as Wellington Water Management Limited on 9 July 2003. The name was changed to Capacity Infrastructure Services Limited in July 2009, and in September 2014 the name was changed to Wellington Water Limited, when Capacity Infrastructure was merged with the water supply group of Greater Wellington Regional Council.

The South Wairarapa District Council transferred the management of their water infrastructure to Wellington Water, as from 1 October 2019.

Wellington Water managed the three waters assets owned by five councils including Hutt, Porirua, Upper Hutt and Wellington City councils, South Wairarapa District Council plus Greater Wellington Regional Council. Wellington Water is jointly owned by all six councils, but the individual councils retain ownership of their assets, and set their own rates and user charges.

Each council was represented on a regional Wellington Water Committee that provided overall leadership and direction for the company. The Chairman of the Wellington Water Committee from its establishment in 2014 was Hutt City Councillor David Bassett. In March 2021, Bassett announced his intention to step down from the role. The mayor of Hutt City, Campbell Barry, took over the role of representing Hutt City on the Wellington Water Committee in May 2021.

Governance of Wellington Water Limited was provided by a board of independent directors. In November 2023, the Chair was Nick Leggett.

In June 2021, Wellington City Council (WCC) announced the resignation of the council's chief infrastructure officer, Tom Williams. This role was responsible for the working relationship between WCC and Wellington Water. Williams was originally appointed after an independent report commissioned by the WCC chief executive in December 2019 found that the relationship between the two entities was lacking trust, and that the management services agreement had remained unsigned for over three years. In a comment about Williams' resignation, the WCC chief executive said that Williams had "built a strong working relationship with Wellington Water."

=== Replacement ===
In late June 2025, the Upper Hutt, Porirua, Lower Hutt, Wellington City Councils and the Greater Wellington Regional Council announced that Wellington Water would be replaced by a new water services entity that would own and manage the various councils' water infrastructure. The new entity would generate its own income independent of council funding and manage its own debts. This new entity is expected to come into existence on 1 July 2026.

In early February 2026, Radio New Zealand reported that Wellington Water would be replaced by a new regional water services entity called Tiaki Wai from 1 July 2026. Tiaki Wai assumed Wellington Water's drinking water, wastewater and stormwater functions and services. The entity will be jointly owned by the Wellington, Porirua, Hutt, Upper Hutt and Greater Wellington councils.

== Asset management challenges ==
The challenges for Wellington Water in managing the three waters included the deteriorated condition of pipelines in the Wellington metropolitan area. The pipelines were in significantly worse condition than those in other large networks nationwide, and there had been a recent history of serious failures. The water supply to the region was also at significant risk should a severe earthquake had occurred, although some projects were underway to improve resilience.

In March 2021, a Director of Wellington Water stated that the company was in dangerous spiral, where the pressure on resources caused by continuing failures was taking funding away from new investment. Councils who are part owners of Wellington Water are increasing the funding for three waters in their Long Term Plans. However, concerns have been raised about the ability of the local resources to deliver an increased volume of work. In November 2023, Wellington Water noted that on-going investment of $1 billion per annum was required to address water issues across the Wellington region, but that this amount was beyond the funding capacity of councils.

Water supplies to the Wellington metropolitan area met the requirements of the Health Act and conformed with drinking water standards. However, for some of the towns in the Kāpiti Coast and Wairarapa regions, there have been occasional non-conformances with the required standards for drinking water quality and safety.

In November 2024, the newly-appointed Chief Executive of Wellington Water stated that persistent under-funding from the contributing councils had led to a culture of "learned helplessness" in Wellington Water. He stated that given the on-going ageing and deterioration of assets, that even if major funding increases were provided, it would take at least 11 years to stabilise the condition of assets at their state as at November 2024. In another revelation, despite being the second largest manager of water assets nationwide, he revealed that the organisation did not own its own asset management information system, and instead relies on asset information services provided by its contractors.

== Performance targets ==
In December 2019, a report to the Wellington City Council revealed that Wellington Water was failing to meet performance targets for response times to urgent callouts, and that it required $600,000 of additional operating funding to clear a backlog of leak repairs.

In February 2020, Wellington Water reported to Wellington City Council that it was not meeting its annual performance targets. It had already failed to meet targets for sewage overflows into the harbour, E coli contamination and callout response times. As one example, the average response time to urgent call outs was eight hours – twice the target of four hours. Wellington Water called for a 30 year programme of investment, and suggested that performance targets be relaxed. The Mayor Andy Foster, said any suggestion to lower targets was rejected.

In December 2020, Audit New Zealand criticised Wellington Water for weaknesses in their non-financial performance indicators, including inability to accurately report the number of complaints about water supply, stormwater or wastewater, or accurately report the number of dry weather sewage overflows. In one twelve month period, there were 2096 reported overflows of wastewater across the network against a target of less than 100. In March 2022, Wellington Water revealed that on average, it took 91 hours to respond to sewage overflows, against a target of 1 hour.

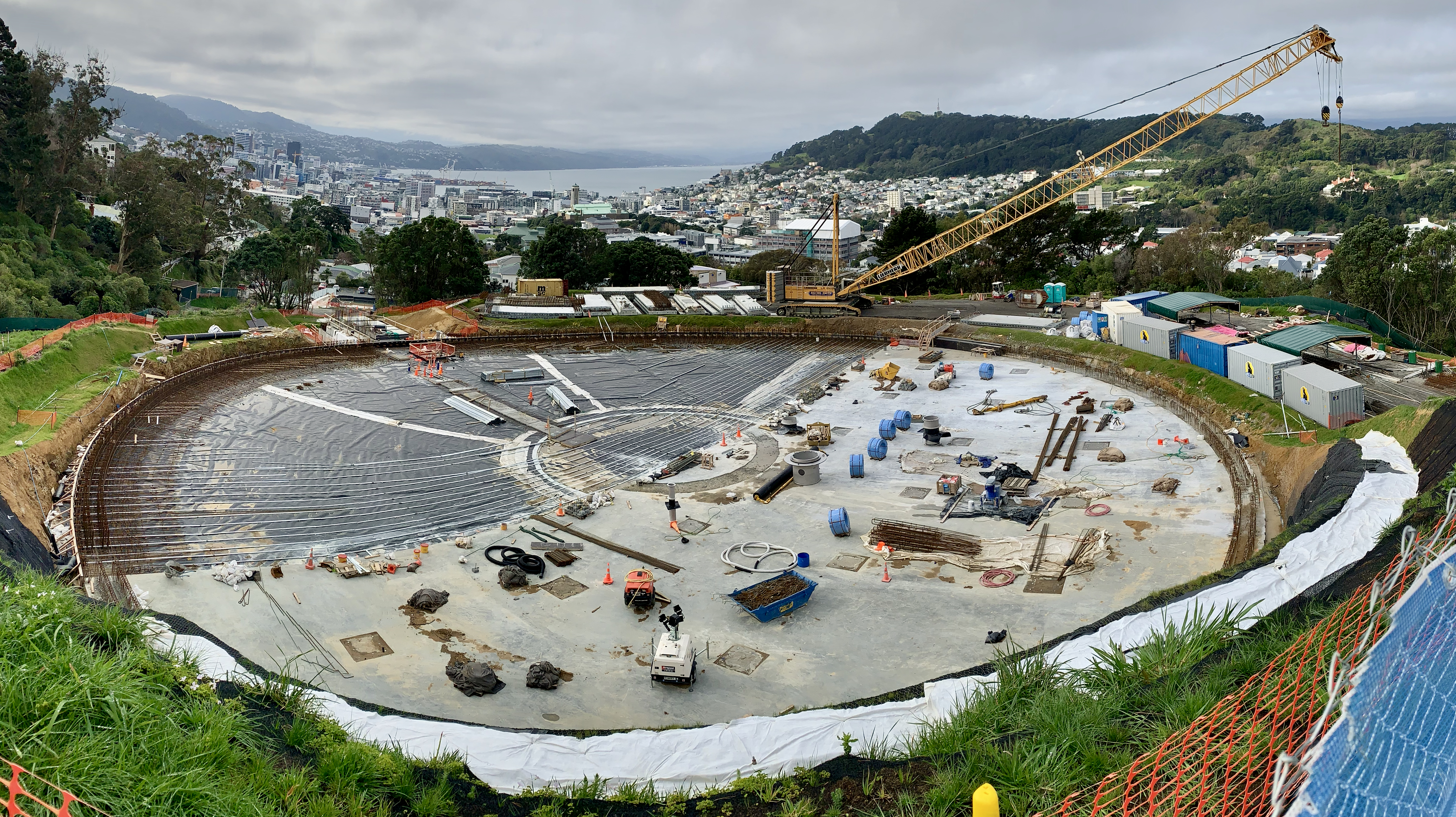
Omāroro water reservoir under construction

== Management of large projects ==
A $10 million increase in the forecast cost of the Omāroro reservoir was reported in June 2020, bringing the new total to almost $70 million. Wellington City Councillors expressed concern about the ability of Wellington Water to manage a project of such a large scale. The council required an independent engineer to sit on Wellington Waters' Major Projects board, and report back to the council.

== Industry reform ==
On 28 January 2020, the Minister of Local Government, Hon Nanaia Mahuta, released Cabinet papers and minutes setting out intentions for reform of service delivery and funding arrangements for the three waters services nationwide. The Cabinet paper referred to two key challenges of affordability and capability that are facing New Zealand's three waters service delivery. There was specific reference to Wellington Water as an example of one approach to service delivery that had successfully built capability through the scale of operations. However, the paper also noted that Wellington Water has no ability to make trade-offs between operating and capital expenditure, nor can it cross-subsidise between owners or ratepayers in different districts.

In April 2022, the Chairperson of the Wellington Water Committee, Lower Hutt mayor Campbell Barry, expressed concerns that Wellington Water was at significant risk of losing staff during the transition to the planned "Entity C" that would have responsibility for the region from Marlborough up to Gisborne, under the Three Waters Reforms. It was expected that by mid-2024, the people employed by Wellington Water, and the asset knowledge held by the business would have transitioned to the new entity.

== Criticisms ==
=== Public relations costs ===
In March 2020, following a period of multiple issues with failures leading to sewage contamination of Wellington harbour, beaches and waterways, Wellington Water engaged an international public relations company SweenyVesty to help improve its community engagement and consultation. In June 2020, there was criticism from a city councillor that Wellington Water had engaged a market research company Colmar Brunton to gather feedback from stakeholders. However, the Chair of the committee overseeing Wellington Water defended the expenditure on the grounds that the annual survey provides quantitative data for performance measures for the company and provides feedback to help the company improve. In the 12 months to December 2020, Wellington Water spent over $350,000 on external public relations and communications consultants.

=== Fluoridation failure ===
In March 2022, Wellington Water revealed that there had been a prolonged failure of fluoridation equipment at water treatment plants owned by Greater Wellington Regional Council at Te Marua and Gear Island. It initially stated that there had been no fluoridation of water for a month, but later admitted that there had been no fluoride in the water from one of the region’s water treatment plants since May 2021 and from another plant since November 2021. There was widespread criticism, and Wellington Water announced it would be holding an independent inquiry into the cause of the failures and why it had provided misleading information.

=== 2025 report and investigation ===
On 3 March 2025, Wellington Water released a critical report uncovering a lack of oversight and assurance over the company's financial processes and how it managed its consultants and contractors. The report also identified one incident of alleged theft amounting to tens of thousands of dollars. The following day, the Commerce Commission launched an investigation into allegations of "potential unlawful conduct" by Wellington Water contractors.

== See also ==
- Water supply and sanitation in the Wellington Region
- Water supply and sanitation in New Zealand
- Infrastructure asset management
- Water supply network
- Wastewater
- Stormwater
