= Local-authority trading enterprise =

A local authority trading enterprise (LATE) was an organisation established in New Zealand under the Local Government Act 1974.

The 1989 legislation assigned regional councils planning and funding responsibilities, but not the transport supplier function. It required regional councils or other territorial authorities either to divest their transport assets to the private sector, or to establish a transport-related local authority trading enterprise.

Local authority trading enterprises were replaced by council-controlled organisations under the Local Government Act 2002.
