= Council-controlled organisation =

New Zealand companies owned by local councils

Council-controlled organisations (CCOs) and council-controlled trading organisations in New Zealand are what were formerly known as local-authority trading enterprises (LATEs). Introduced under sections 6 and 7 of the Local Government Act 2002, they are essentially any company with a majority council shareholding, or a trust or similar organisation with a majority of council-controlled votes or council-appointed trustees, unless designated otherwise. More than one council may be represented in a council-controlled organisation.

They are used for widely varying purposes by councils. For example, the Wellington City Council uses trusts to hold museums and its zoo, while in 1996 the Horowhenua District Council transferred its library functions to the Horowhenua Library Trust.

In the past, the erstwhile for-profit LATEs were seen as the local government equivalent of state-owned enterprises (SOEs). Many of these, which included bus companies, diagnostic laboratories, public works divisions and property investment companies, were privatised. For-profit council organisations are now termed council-controlled trading organisations under the Act. Council-controlled organisations pay tax to central government, unlike the internal activities of councils which are tax-free.

The Local Government Act exempts certain organisations from its legislative control and there is a mechanism under Section 7 to manually designate further exceptions. The automatic exceptions include:

- electricity companies and electricity trusts
- energy companies
- port companies and their subsidiaries
- Infrastructure Auckland and its subsidiaries
- New Zealand Local Government Association and its subsidiaries
- New Zealand Local Government Insurance Corporation
- Watercare Services (Auckland)

== See also ==
- Auckland Transport, New Zealand's largest CCO
- Christchurch City Holdings, owns and runs some of the important infrastructure in Christchurch
