= Domestic rates in Northern Ireland =

Domestic rates are the local government taxation in Northern Ireland. Rates are a tax on property based on the capital value of the residential property on 1 January 2005. Domestic rates consist of two components, a regional rate set by the Northern Ireland Assembly and a district rate set by local councils. Rate levels are set annually. Valuation and rating of property is handled by Land and Property Services. Domestic rates are unique to Northern Ireland, in the rest of the United Kingdom the local taxation is Council Tax.

== Valuation ==
Land and Property Services is the authority responsible for registering and valuing property. The domestic rates are based on the capital value of the residential property on 1 January 2005. This is in contrast to non-domestic rates on businesses which are based on rental value.

== District rate ==
The district rate is set by local authorities, the eleven district councils. It is for services such as refuse collections and disposal, leisure, parks and street cleaning.

District rates in 2019 to 2020 are as follows:

Council	Domestic rate poundage
Antrim and Newtownabbey Council	0.008152
Ards and North Down Borough Council	0.007836
Armagh City, Banbridge & Craigavon Borough Council	0.008886
Belfast City Council	0.007901
Causeway Coast and Glens	0.008195
Derry City and Strabane District Council	0.009419
Fermanagh and Omagh Council	0.008142
Lisburn & Castlereagh Council	0.007611
Mid & East Antrim Council	0.00887
Mid Ulster Council	0.007841
Newry, Mourne and Down Council	0.008467

== Regional rate ==
The regional rate is set by the Northern Ireland Assembly. It is used for services such as education, health and roads.

== Rate Rebate ==
Working age customers living in Northern Ireland and claiming Universal Credit can now claim Rate Rebate for help with domestic rates.

== Housing benefit ==
Another rebate existed for domestic rates. Confusingly, this was named Housing Benefit & Rate Relief, despite another Housing Benefit also existing to assist with rent payments. This benefit is now restricted to pensioners, and benefit claimants receiving a Severe Disability Premium.

Administration of Housing Benefit was split between two organisations depending on whether the claimant was renting or was an owner-occupier; tenants could claim both kinds of Housing Benefit, while owner-occupiers could only get Housing Benefit for rates.

- Tenants had to apply to the Northern Ireland Housing Executive regardless of whether they rented from a private landlord, from the NIHE itself, or from a housing association.
- Owner-occupiers had to apply to the Land and Property Services agency.
