= Local Government Act 1974 (New Zealand) =

Act of Parliament in New Zealand

New Zealand Parliament
- Long title: An Act to consolidate and amend the law relating to the reorganisation of the districts and functions of local authorities, to make better provision for the administration of those functions which can most effectively be carried out on a regional basis, and to make provision for the establishment of united councils, regional councils, district councils, district community councils, and community councils, and to consolidate and amend the Municipal Corporations Act 1954, the Counties Act 1956, the Local Authorities (Petroleum Tax) Act 1970, and provisions of other Acts of the Parliament of New Zealand relating to the powers and functions of regional councils, united councils, and territorial local authorities
- Assented to: 8 November 1974
- Commenced: 1 December 1974
- Administered by: Department of Internal Affairs

Legislative history
- Introduced by: Henry May
- Passed: 1974

Amended by
- 1989

Related legislation
- Local Government Act 2002
- Status: Current legislation

The Local Government Act 1974 of New Zealand consolidated the law relating to local government in New Zealand.

The Act made provision for the establishment of:

- unitary authorities
- regional councils (which were not established until the 1989 local government reforms)
- district councils
- district community councils
- community councils
- local authority trading enterprises

The Act consolidated and amended the Municipal Corporations Act 1954, the Counties Act 1956, the Local Authorities (Petroleum Tax) Act 1970, and provisions of other Acts of the Parliament of New Zealand relating to the powers and functions of regional councils, united councils, and territorial local authorities.

The legislation is the legal basis for the governances of the cities, districts and regions of New Zealand.

Although most of the Act was repealed when the Local Government Act 2002 was enacted, some sections, providing for the management of roads, transport, navigation, drainage, rivers and waste management, still apply.

== See also ==
- Local Government New Zealand
- List of cities in New Zealand
