= Local Government (Rating) Act 2002 =

Act of Parliament in New Zealand

New Zealand Parliament
- Assented to: 30 March 2002
- Commenced: 1 July 2003

Repeals
- Rating Powers Act (1988); see Sched 6 Part 1 of the Act for other repeals

Amended by
- 2006

Related legislation
- Rating Valuations Act 1998
- Status: Current legislation

The Local Government (Rating) Act 2002 of New Zealand is an Act of New Zealand's Parliament that empowers Local Government bodies to levy property taxes on property owners within their jurisdictions. These property taxes are called rates. They are assessed annually and usually paid in four equal instalments.

== Introduction ==
New Zealand no longer has land taxes per se. Formerly, NZ did have land taxes—its first ever direct tax, enacted in 1878, was a land tax (levied at a rate of one halfpenny per pound of unimproved land value). But the contribution of land taxes to the government steadily reduced and by 1967 represented a mere 0.5% of total government revenues. In 1982 it was observed that only 5% of all land was taxed (the rest was exempted under one of an increasing list of exemptions), and so in 1990, land tax was repealed.

Instead, it has property taxes related to land. This might seem like a distinction in search of a meaning, and in simplest terms a property tax is more flexible than a land tax, and can be applied to both land and the improvements on the land.

In New Zealand, as in most countries, residents pay income tax, a Goods and Services Tax, and property taxes (as well as assorted other minor taxes and fees). Although property taxes are the least substantial of these three principal forms of taxation, they are generally held to be the most unpopular. They are possibly the most 'obvious', they are the hardest to structure or minimize, and they apply no matter if resident is wealthy or poor. Being sensitive to the public dislike of property taxes, and a general feeling of alienation and disenfranchisement from the tax setting and policy process, the NZ Government set about a major rewrite of both the legislation defining how local government bodies were managed (the Local Government Act 2002) and the property tax setting process (this Act).

== Purpose of the Act ==
Section 3 of the Act states its purpose in three points:

(a) providing local authorities with flexible powers to set, assess, and collect rates to fund local government activities
(b) ensuring that rates are set in accordance with decisions that are made in a transparent and consultative manner
(c) providing for processes and information to enable ratepayers to identify and understand their liability for rates.

The powers given to local authorities are indeed broad and flexible (as per the first point) which leads to the constraining second point—rates can only be set and collected after going through a formal process of consultation with the public. The third point makes the process even more transparent—it requires a detailed breakdown of the amount being collected in rates each year so that rate payers know exactly what they are funding.

== Provisions of the Act ==
The Act sets out what types of land can be rated (i.e. taxed), either in full or partially, and what types of land are exempt from local government rates. The Act sets out parameters for how land can be differentiated, and the types of methods and formulas that can be used for assessing rates. It also contains administrative type provisions for how values are calculated and rates are assessed and collected, penalties for late payment, and other special case considerations.

=== Rateable land ===
The Act states that all land, unless otherwise excepted, is rateable.

In Schedule 1 to the Act it defines 25 categories of land that are non-rateable and also three categories of land which are rateable at no more than 50% of the regular rate. Non-rateable land is primarily land that is owned by the national or local government, or owned by a charity and available to the public, and some categories of Maori land.

Land that is at least 50% non-rateable is land owned or used by Agricultural and Pastoral Societies as showgrounds, sportsgrounds (but not horse or greyhound racetracks) and/or land owned or used by any group for any branch of the arts.

Non-rateable land is still liable to pay rates related to water supply, sewage disposal, and/or refuse collection.

=== Rateable units and SUIPs ===
Understanding what comprises a single rating unit is important when rates such as a Uniform Annual General Rate (see below) is imposed on each rating unit. The concept of rating unit is defined in the Rating Valuations Act 1998.

Generally, each separate certificate of title is considered to be its own rating unit. But if multiple certificates of title are owned by the same person or persons, are used jointly as a single unit, and are either contiguous (i.e. next to each other) or separated only by a road or rail line or body of water, then they can be deemed a single rating unit. So, for example, a farmer with land on four different titles, on both sides of a road that goes through the middle of his property, would most likely have his four titles deemed to be a single rating unit.

A second related concept is that of determining a count of Separately Used or Inhabited Parts of a Rating Unit (SUIP). It is possible that one rating unit might have multiple SUIPs on it—for example, a piece of land with three condo/apartments on it. This becomes relevant when general rates such as Uniform Annual General Charges are imposed, not per rating unit, but per SUIP.

=== Types of rates ===
The Act defines two main categories of rates: general rates and targeted rates.

==== General rates ====
A general type of rate is usually adopted when the local authority believes the community as a whole should pay for a service, or where there is no good reason or reason to separate the cost out and fund it specifically. General rates apply to all ratepayers within the local authority's jurisdiction.

A general rate can be either a Uniform Annual General Charge which applies equally to all ratepayers, or a 'value based' rate which is based on some element of the property's value (either its unimproved (land) value, its combined value of land and improvements, or its annual value).

Value based rates can be calculated either on a standard rate per dollar of rateable value, or at different rates for different categories of rating units. The different categories that could be considered are listed in Schedule 2 to the Act.

More than one general rate can be imposed. For example, a ratepayer may be levied a UAGC of $200 plus a differential rate of 0.25% of the total property value.

==== Targeted rates ====
Targeted rates are sometimes used where a specific service or benefit is being provided unevenly to some ratepayers but not to others. Targeted rates can also be imposed on all ratepayers, with the monies received being earmarked to fund a specific purpose.

An example of a targeted rate might be a 'Central Business District' rate imposed on property in a town's central business district and used to fund specific services in that area.

Another example might be a water rate—possibly a flat fee per rating unit that is connected to a central water service, and/or possibly a fee per cubic metre of water provided. A related rate would be a sewage disposal rate, often calculated on the basis of the number of toilet bowls or urinals present in each rating unit.

Water and sewage rates can have three 'states' associated with them. If a rating unit does not have that service available, then the first state (i.e. no charge) would apply. If a rating unit has the service available, but the service is not being used, then one level of rate might be imposed, and if the service is available and being used, then a second higher level of rate might be imposed.

===== Matters and factors =====
The Act employs confusing terminology when describing the process for setting targeted rates. It helps to see it as a two step process.

In Schedule 2, it lists a set of matters—these are considerations that determine which rating units will be liable for, and which rating units will not be liable for a particular rate.

In Schedule 3, it lists a set of factors—these are considerations that determine how and what amounts will be payable.

There are nine matters that can be considered, for example, where the land is located, or the use to which the land is put. There are twelve factors that can be used in calculating rates, for example, the area of floor space within any buildings on the land or the value of improvements to the rating unit.

==== Thirty per cent cap on flat fee rates ====
Because they are felt to be regressive in nature, there is a 30% cap on how much of the total rates revenue can be collected from Uniform Annual General Charges and from targeted rates that are set on a uniform basis, except for uniformly targeted rates that apply for water supply or sewage disposal.

=== Calculating rateable values ===
The Act requires properties to be valued at least once every three years. The Rating Valuations Act (1998) covers much of this process, and Part 2 of this Act sets out the record keeping requirements of each local government body. Most local bodies have their rating database available online, and are required to have it available for free public inspection at their principal public office or an alternate appropriate location during regular business hours.

Ratepayers can challenge the accuracy of their property valuation or the information held about their property.

=== Setting rates ===
The process of setting rates seems deceptively simply in the Act (section 23)—i.e., being set by a resolution of the local authority.

This apparent simplicity is because most of the process is prescribed in section 103 of the Local Government Act 2002. It requires rates to be congruent with the Revenue and Financing Policy in the Long Term Plan, and for each year's rate-setting to be based on the annual plan for the year and its associated Funding Impact Statement. Rate models must be included in the FIS, and if the rate setting process isn't strictly followed, the rates thereby levied may be uncollectable.

=== Remitting and postponing rates ===
The Act allows local authorities to remit all or part of the rates on a rating unit if the local authority has established a formal policy allowing itself to do so.

The act allows local authorities to postpone all or part of the rates on a rating unit, again if there is an existing formal policy allowing such postponement. The policy may set a fee that applies in such cases, but if a fee is applied, it can not exceed the actual administrative and financial costs involved.

These types of waivers need to be formally reviewed at least once every six years by the local authority

There are also income-tested provisions under the Rates Rebate Act (1973) that provides a subsidy to low income homeowners to help them meet the cost of their rates.

== Problems with the Act ==
The national government's Auditor General audits all local authority annual reports, and several times has prepared specific reports on common issues and concerns that have arisen from its reviews.

After the first year of the new Act's operation, the Auditor General reported in 2005 on some inconsistencies to do with how local authorities could reset rates during a rating year, and how they should handle any rate surpluses collected.

In 2006, the Auditor General reviewed the specific policies relating to postponement of rates.

A formal inquiry, chaired by David Shand and sometimes referred to as the Shand Report, but formally titled 'Funding Local Government' was undertaken in 2006 and reported in 2007. This inquiry noted that in a number of respects, the consultation, planning and accountability practices of local authorities were more advanced than those of central government. Nonetheless, it came up with 96 specific recommendations grouped into eight categories for future improvements.

One of the Report's more surprising recommendations was that local authorities should fund more capital works from debt, which it felt was a fair and appropriate way to fund long-term capital benefits, and which could allow for a 10% reduction of current rates.

In general, very few of the Report's recommendations have been acted on.

In 2014, the Auditor General provided some commentary on their auditing policies and issues uncovered to do with local authority rates. They reported that most local authorities had some problems with rating compliance, and that they uncovered compliance problems with every aspect of the Act's requirements. The report goes on to cite some of the problems uncovered, with the problems generally being failures of procedure or understanding of the Act's requirements, rather than being anything willfully fraudulent.

== Statistics ==
It is difficult to give accurate time series data for rates revenues, due to the changing nature of local authorities, one-off transactions each year, and the dominating/distortive impact of Auckland. So we are providing some simple headline data here.

Between the period 1993–94 and 2006–2007, rates increased by 38% in real terms, i.e., after adjusting for inflation.

A report commissioned by the Local Government Association shows that real rates per household have increased by almost 50% between 1993 and 2011.

The Department of Internal Affairs published a detailed set of time series and analysis of how rates were imposed in July 2011.

In 2009–10, local authorities collected $2.9 billion in rates receipts, being 53% of total operating revenue of $5.5 billion.

In 2010–11, local authorities rates receipts made up 54% of total operating revenue. This increased still further to 55% of total operating revenue in 2011–12.

Following what seems to be a trend, rates made up 56% of total operating revenue in the 2012–13 year. For the 2013–14 year, although rate revenues increased 4% over the previous year, the percentage of total operating revenue dropped to 54% as a result of some asset revaluations in Auckland. The 2014-15 year showed rates receipts returning to 'normal' trends and totalling 57% of total revenues.

== General bibliography ==
- "Local Government Rates Inquiry". The Department of Internal Affairs/Te Tari Taiwhenua. 3 August 2007. Archived from the original on 25 May 2012.
