= Business rates in Northern Ireland =

Northern Ireland tax

Business rates in Northern Ireland are a tax on non-domestic property including offices, factories and shops.

In the 2020-2021 fiscal year, no rates were collected due to the COVID-19 pandemic.

All properties are to be revalued by 2023. The Non-domestic Rates Valuations (Coronavirus) Act (Northern Ireland) 2022 provided a discount in rates.
