= Water supply and sanitation in New Zealand =

New Zealand: Water and sanitation

Data
- Water coverage (broad definition): 100%
- Sanitation coverage (broad definition): 100%
- Continuity of supply (%): Mostly continuous
- Average residential water use (l/p/d): 281 (2020)
- Average domestic water and sewer bill: NZD$960/year (2020)
- Share of household metering: 50%
- Annual investment in WSS: NZD$1.8 billion CAPEX (2020/21)
- Share of self-financing by utilities: High
- Share of tax-financing: Nil
- Share of external financing: Nil

Institutions
- Decentralisation to municipalities: In all regions
- Water and sanitation regulator: Taumata Arowai
- Responsibility for policy setting: Shared between Ministry of Health and Department of Internal Affairs
- Sector law: Health Act 1956; Water Services Act 2021

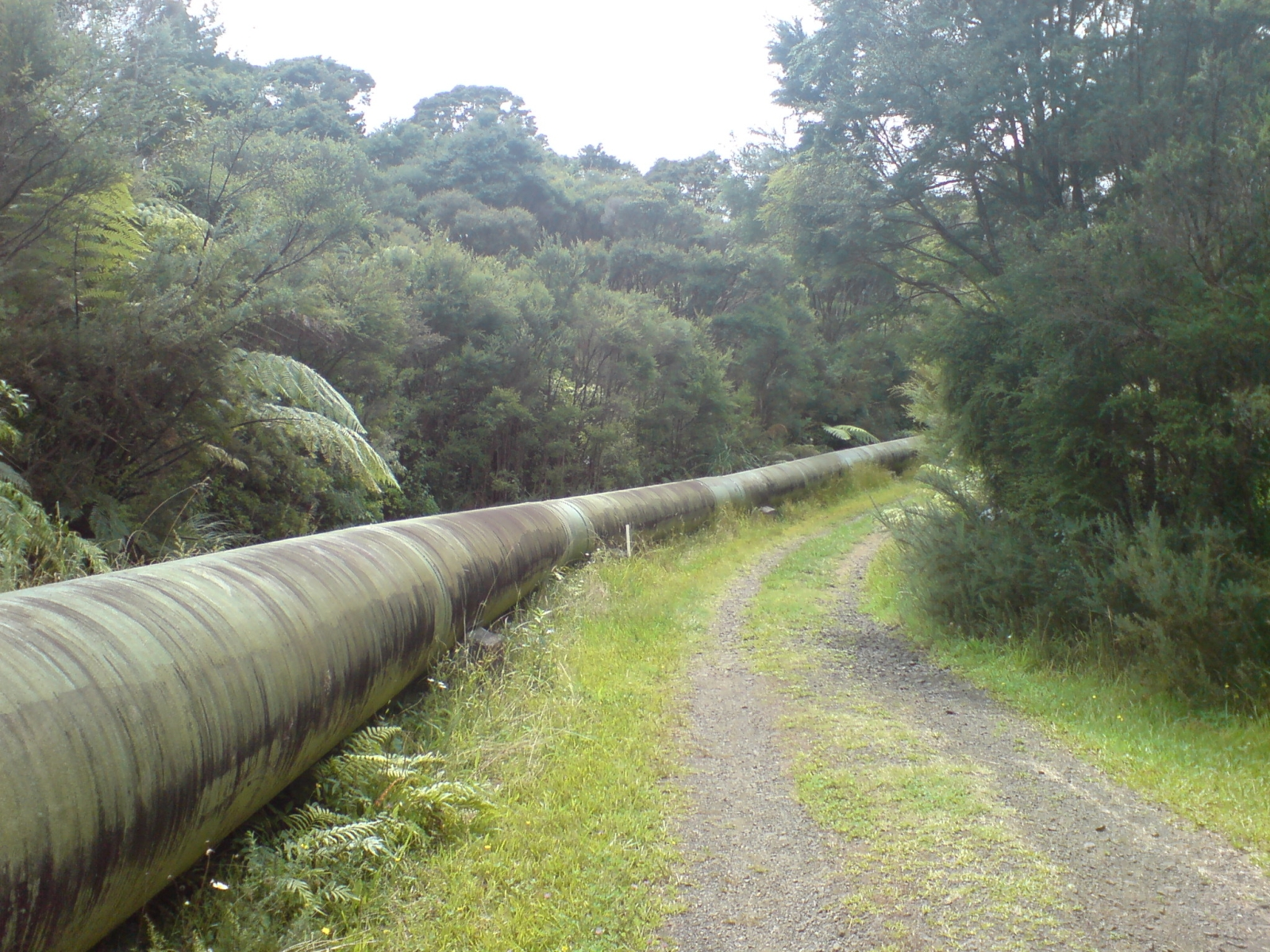
Water Pipeline through Waitakere, New Zealand

Water supply and sanitation in New Zealand is provided for most people by infrastructure owned by territorial authorities including city councils in urban areas and district councils in rural areas. As at 2021, there are 67 different asset-owning organisations.

There is widespread evidence of ageing and failing infrastructure for the three waters (drinking water, stormwater and wastewater), and growing awareness of a multi-billion dollar national infrastructure deficit. In some regions there are forecast to be huge, and in some cases unaffordable cost challenges for local authorities.

The challenges for local government include funding infrastructure deficits and preparing for large re-investments that are estimated to require $110 billion over the next 30 to 40 years. As one example of the scale of expenditure required, in May 2021, the Wellington City Council approved a 10-year plan that included expenditure of $2.7 billion on water pipe maintenance and upgrades in Wellington city, and an additional $147 to $208 million for plant upgrades at the Moa Point wastewater treatment plant.

There are also significant challenges in meeting statutory requirements for the safety of drinking water, and the environmental expectations for management of stormwater and wastewater. Climate change adaptation, and providing for population growth add to these challenges.

A major programme of nationwide reform is being developed by central government, with the aim of rationalizing the provision of services for the three waters. It is proposed that a small number of large publicly owned entities will be established to own and manage the three waters assets across the country. The reforms include complete separation of asset ownership from the existing territorial authorities. The nationwide reform programme is being developed in partnership with local government and iwi/Māori as the Crown's Treaty partner. In late October 2021, the Labour Government launched its Three Waters reform programme, which aims to centralise the management and provision of water utilities services by 2024. In mid-February 2024, the National-led coalition government repealed the Three Waters programme and announced its own water reform programme known as "Local Water Done Well."

The privately owned water supply schemes that service many small rural areas are not included in the reform programme.

== Access ==
Access to water and sanitation was declared a human right by the United Nations General Assembly on 28 July 2010.

The 2030 Agenda for Sustainable Development was adopted by all United Nations Member States in 2015. At its heart are 17 Sustainable Development Goals, including the sixth of the 17 goals which is to ensure availability and sustainable management of water and sanitation for all. While the New Zealand Government has expressed its commitment to meeting the Sustainable Development Goals, it is yet to announce any specific policy or data strategy for that purpose.

Access to drinking water provided by registered suppliers (as opposed to self-supply) can be estimated from the reports into the safety of drinking water from registered suppliers that are published by Institute of Environmental Science and Research (ESR). As of 15 April 2020, the Drinking Water online database included records of water supplied to an estimated population of approximately 4.1 million. This indicates that around 85% of the estimated total population of New Zealand at that date receive water from a registered supplier. The balance of the population (approximately 15%) rely upon small self-managed supplies including roof rainwater collection systems.

In their National Performance Review 2020–21, Water New Zealand reported that 86% of residential properties are connected to a water network, and 85% connected to a wastewater network.

== Three waters assets and services ==
Key data about the three waters (water, wastewater, and stormwater) is made publicly available in a National Performance Review undertaken by an industry body Water New Zealand. This review has been undertaken annually since 2008, to provide a performance assessment of service provision and the protection of public health and the environment. The participants in the 2020–21 review included 38 (of 64) service providers, with service areas covering 87% of the New Zealand population.

=== Three waters assets ===
The 38 participants in the 2020–21 review (covering 87% of the population), manage assets with a total book value exceeding $40 billion. A summary of assets is given in the table below.

	Water	Wastewater	Stormwater
Treatment plants	339	193	
Network length in kilometres	42,559	26,309	18,452
Combined wastewater and stormwater pipelines		243	
Pump stations	817	2,942	213

=== Capital and operational expenditure ===
The 2020–21 National Performance Review provides a summary of capital and operational expenditure on the three waters assets.

Type of expenditure	Water supply	Wastewater	Stormwater
Capital expenditure	$868M	$714M	$237M
Interest	$56M	$85M	$31M
Operational expenditure	$376M	$465M	$118M
Total	$1,299M	$1,264M	$386M

=== Affordability ===
Average water and wastewater charges are slightly under $850 per year. However, water and wastewater charges vary significantly around New Zealand. Consumers in some areas are paying over three times as much as for water as those in other areas ($863/year versus $262/year). For wastewater, the range in charges is even greater at over ten times as much ($1,217 versus $116/year). In the most expensive jurisdiction, the average customer will have a water and wastewater bill of over $1,700. For those who depend on the single living-alone superannuation payment, the water and wastewater bill in the most expensive region constitutes over 8% of their income. For those dependent on the sole parent support payment, it constitutes more than 10% of their income.

The challenges for the affordability of modern safe water supplies in small townships were highlighted in 2021 when the Buller District Council proposed to increase the water rates in Inangahua Junction. The increased rate was proposed to be $1800 per household by 2025 (almost four times the current rate), and $2000 by 2030. A former councillor said: "Most people in Inangahua Junction are pensioners; they're on low fixed incomes and they simply have no ability to pay these sorts of fees". The mayor of Buller District said that the planned increases related to the requirements to comply with government-mandated drinking water standards for public water supplies.

=== Auditor-General review ===
In February 2020, the Auditor-General published a report reviewing how well public organisations are managing water resources and delivering water-related services. In the introduction to the report, the Auditor-General observed a lack of clarity about the issues in managing the three waters, how to address them, and who will deliver programmes of work. The statement called for improved national leadership.

== Asset management and investment planning ==
On 29 January 2020, the Government announced the investment of $12 billion in the New Zealand Upgrade Programme, focussing on rail, roads, schools and hospitals.

An economist from Infometrics questioned whether the investment programme was focussed in the areas of greatest need, and pointed to New Zealand's ageing water infrastructure. Their analysis of council expenditure plans found that investment in the three waters is expected to be $17.2 billion over the next decade, split between $11.6 billion in waste and stormwater, and $5.6 billion for water supply. However, more than half of the planned investment in waste and stormwater is to replace assets that are at the end of their working life, with only a quarter of the money allocated for additions and improvements. They claimed that further new investment in water infrastructure is needed to cope with a growing population and the demands of the Government's three waters review, aimed at improving the quality of drinking water, storm water and waste water.

In 2021, the Department of Internal Affairs estimated that investment of $110 billion in the three waters assets could be required over the next 30 to 40 years.

== Reform of policy and regulation ==
=== Legal framework ===
The legal framework includes the Health Act 1956, amended in 2007, the Local Government Act 2002 and the Resource Management Act 1991.

=== Three Waters Review ===
In mid–2017, the Fifth National Government launched a review of the regulation and supply arrangements of drinking water, wastewater and stormwater (three waters). This review ran in parallel with the later stages of the Inquiry into the Havelock North drinking water contamination of 2016. The Three Waters Review was published in January 2019. In 2019, the Sixth Labour Government announced plans for regulatory changes in response to the Three Waters Review including establishing a new, dedicated drinking water regulator, extending regulatory coverage to all drinking water supplies; providing a multi-barrier approach to drinking water treatment and safety; strengthening government oversight of wastewater and stormwater services; and providing transitional arrangements for water suppliers to conform to the new regulations.

=== Taumata Arowai - Water Services Regulator ===
A new regulator for drinking water services was created with the passing of the Taumata Arowai - Water Services Regulator Act in 2020. The new regulator Taumata Arowai required that around 2,000 water suppliers must prepare a primary water safety plan, and set a deadline of November 2022. Around 1200 of the 2000 water suppliers were also required to produce a risk management plan dealing with the sources of their water, but many missed the deadline. By May 2023, only 750 plans had been received, although the plans that included a separate risk management covered 86% of the population, leaving only smaller suppliers who were yet to comply.

=== Three Waters reforms programme ===
On 28 January 2020, the Minister of Local Government, Nanaia Mahuta, released Cabinet papers and minutes setting out intentions for reform of service delivery and funding arrangements for the three waters services nationwide. The Cabinet paper identified affordability and capability as two key challenges facing New Zealand's three waters service delivery infrastructure. The paper proposed transferring control and administration of three water provision services to a new entity that would focus on the provision of water services. The Government indicated that it would work with local government bodies to explore options for transitioning councils to new service delivery arrangements and investigate opportunities for collaborative approaches to water service delivery.

On 27 October 2021, Mahuta confirmed that the Government would proceed with its "Three Waters reform programme" to transfer management of storm water, drinking water and wastewater to four new entities by July 2024. These entities would be managed by independent boards jointly elected by a group set up by councils and Māori iwi (tribes). These proposed reforms were criticised by several local council leaders including Mayor of Auckland Phil Goff, Mayor of Christchurch Lianne Dalziel, Mayor of Wellington Andy Foster, and the opposition National and ACT parties. By contrast, Ngāi Tahu's Te Maire Tau, the co-chair of Te Kura Taka Pini (the tribe's freshwater group), welcomed the Three Water reforms, claiming they would improve water services and environmental outcomes.

From November 2021, a working group of mayors and Māori representatives reviewed issues of representation, governance and accountability, and reported back in March 2022 with 47 recommendations. In April 2022, the government accepted 44 of the recommendations. Key changes to the original proposals included providing shareholdings for councils in the four new water entities, and increased legislative protection against future privatisation of the water assets. The Water Services Entities Act 2022 was passed in December 2022. In mid-April 2023, the Government announced a major overhaul of its Three Waters reform programme, renaming it the Water Services Reform Programme. The proposed four water services entities were expanded into ten entities but would retain the same split co-governance structure consisting of representatives of local councils and mana whenua representatives.

=== Local Water Done Well ===
In mid-February 2024, the National-led coalition government repealed the previous Labour Government's Three Waters legislation. The Government also announced that it would introduce its own water infrastructure reforms known as "Local Water Done Well," which would emphasise local councils' ownership of water assets.

In early May 2024 Mayor of Auckland Wayne Brown and Local Government Minister Simeon Brown jointly announced that Auckland would avoid a 25.8 percent rates increase as part of the Government's Local Water Done Well plan.

In early August 2024, Brown announced that council-controlled organisations would be able to borrow money for water infrastructure from the Local Government Funding Agency. The Government also introduced its first Local Water Done Well bill which is expected to pass into law in August 2024. Under the legislation, local councils have a year to develop plans for funding water services they need and ensuring their financial sustainability. This legislation passed into law on 28 August 2024.

== Supply of drinking water ==
New Zealand enjoys high rainfall, especially within the West Coast region of the South Island and the country is notable for its many large, and sometimes braided rivers. However, although the population is relatively small, the population density in North Island is much greater than in South Island where most of the rain falls.

In New Zealand more than 10% of the population depends on roof-collected rainwater systems for their drinking water – especially in rural areas that are not served by municipal town water supplies. Roof-collected rainwater consumption is also popular because the general public has the perception that rainwater is "pure" and safe to drink. Indeed, the risk of disease arising from roof-collected rainwater consumption can be low, providing that the water is visibly clear, has little taste or smell and, most importantly, the storage and collection of rainwater is via a properly maintained tank and roof catchment system.

The low level of water pollution and the relative abundance of rain-fall ensures that water shortages are relatively uncommon. Regional authorities provide abstraction, treatment and distribution infrastructure to most developed areas. Many municipal systems draw water from deep aquifers thus avoiding the cost of long pipelines. Some of these aquifer fed systems such as that serving Christchurch was of sufficiently good quality that no disinfection of final water was practised until the recent earthquake events. Following restoration of the network the water is no longer chlorinated. Water taken from shallower or less secure aquifers are at risk of contamination.

=== Water supply volumes and losses ===
The 2018–19 National Performance Review includes data about water supply volumes from the participants in the study. Residential consumption is estimated because only around 50% of residential properties nationwide have a meter installed. Water New Zealand noted that in this annual review, the total volume of non-residential water use is under-represented, and residential consumption overestimated, as some participants did not provide volumes of non-residential water use.

Water end use	Volume (m^{3})
Non-residential water consumption	127,184,998
Residential consumption estimate	316,963,581
Total network water loss	119,010,271
Water supplied to system	563,158,850

The median of the average daily water consumption across participants is 263 litres per person per day, but there is a large spread in residential water efficiency in different areas.

In the 2019 fiscal year, participants reported 119 million cubic meters of water was lost in their water supply systems, equivalent to over 47,000 Olympic-sized swimming pools. This constituted 18% of the 555 million cubic meters of water supplied to the system.

=== Treatment of drinking water ===
Most drinking water supplied through reticulated networks in New Zealand is disinfected using chlorination. However, some communities have water sources derived from deep aquifers that they consider are "secure" or low risk without chlorination. There is opposition to chlorination in some of these communities. However, Water New Zealand, the industry association that represents 1900 water engineers and specialists, advocates for chlorination of all public water supplies.

Water supplies in New Zealand generally have low concentrations of naturally occurring fluoride, at levels that are insufficient to promote good dental health. Fluoridation of public water supplies is undertaken in most public water supplies, typically at a rate between 0.7 and 1.0 mg/L. A report by the Office of the Prime Minister's Chief Science Advisor issued in 2021 confirmed previous studies that showed a positive impact of fluoridation on dental health, and no significant adverse effects. In 2021, the Health (Fluoridation of Drinking Water) Amendment Bill was passed, transferring control over the decision to fluoridate drinking water from local councils to the Director-General of Health.

== Drinking-water safety ==
=== Significant incidents ===
==== Havelock North contamination 2016 ====
From 12 to 29 August 2016 the town of Havelock North experienced New Zealand's largest recorded outbreak of waterborne disease. Campylobacter entered the town's water supply. Of the town's 13,000 residents, 5,500 fell ill, 45 were hospitalised and four died.

===== Inquiry and findings =====
In September 2016, the Government announced an Inquiry into the outbreak, in two stages. Stage 1 focused on identifying what happened, what caused the outbreak, and assessing the conduct of those responsible for providing safe drinking water to Havelock North. Stage 2 of the Inquiry addressed lessons learned for the future and steps to be implemented to reduce the likelihood of such an outbreak occurring again.

The drinking water for Havelock North was sourced from an aquifer under the Heretaunga Plains (the Te Mata aquifer) that was thought to be a confined aquifer secure from contaminants. The District Council did not treat water drawn from this aquifer before it was distributed to consumers. During a period of heavy rain, a paddock adjacent to the bore became inundated, and sheep faeces caused contamination of the bore water. The Inquiry found that in July 1998, there had been a previous incident of contamination of drinking water at Havelock North, but that the lessons from that incident had been forgotten. Another key finding was that several of the parties with responsibility for the water supply regime for Havelock North had failed to adhere to the high levels of care and diligence needed to protect public health and to avoid outbreaks of serious illness. The Inquiry concluded that a higher standard of care was needed, similar to that applied in the fields of medicine and aviation where the consequences of a failure could similarly be illness, injury or death.

===== Recommendations and subsequent research findings =====
The recommendations arising from Stage 2 of the Inquiry including wide-ranging proposals for legislative and regulatory changes to drive systematic improvements in the management of drinking water nationwide. The recommendations also included mandatory treatment of all drinking water networks and certain self-supplied systems, and the review of drinking water standards and guidelines.

The Institute of Environmental Science and Research (ESR) carried out genome-sequencing on the campylobacter strain that was found in sick people during the outbreak. The subsequent research has shown that some people living outside Havelock North, but who visited the area during the time of the outbreak, were also affected. The study suggests that the total number of campylobacteriosis cases traceable to the water contamination could be as high as 8320, with up to 2230 of these living outside of Havelock North.

=== Cryptosporidium outbreak in Queenstown 2023 ===
In September 2023, there was an outbreak of illness caused by cryptosporidium in Queenstown, with most cases located in the central business area and affecting people under the age of 40. Health officials were unable to immediately link the cases, or identify the source of the outbreak, and described the outbreak as very unusual. A "boil water" notice was issued. The regulator Taumata Arowai issued a compliance order to the Queenstown Lakes District Council for one of its water treatment plants, because it did not have a protozoa barrier to prevent cryptosporidium entering the water supply.

=== Drinking water standards ===
==== Annual drinking-water quality report - 2017-18 ====
The Ministry of Health provides an annual report on the drinking-water quality of all registered networked drinking-water supplies serving populations of more than 100 people. The report for the period 1 July 2017 to 30 June 2018 describes compliance with the requirements of the Drinking-water Standards for New Zealand and progress made towards meeting the requirements of the Health Act 1956.

Performance criteria	Population	
Water complies with all the legislative requirements under the Act	3,250,000	(84.7%)
Implementation of a water safety plan for the supply has commenced	3,810,000	(99.3%)
Met the bacteriological requirements of Standards	3,751,000	(97.7%)
Met all the monitoring requirements in the Standards	3,531,000	(92.0%)

== Sanitation ==
All significant sized urban developments are served by municipal sewers which drain to modern treatment works with final discharges to river or the sea.

Wellington and the Hutt Valley were the last major urban centres to cease the disposal of untreated sewage to the ocean. Fine screening was introduced in the 1980s and secondary treatment plants were installed between 1996 and 2002.

Rural communities and isolated housing is served by septic tanks or by chemical toilets or earth closets depending on location and usage.

The 135 wastewater treatment plants discharge into the following type of environment:

Estuary 5
Groundwater 8
Lake 1
Land 26
Long Sea Outfall 22
Near Shore Outfall 7
River/stream/drain 62
Wetland 4

== Stormwater ==
In its summary of the findings from the National Performance Review 2018–19, Water New Zealand observed that management of stormwater quality is not yet widespread. Stormwater quality monitoring programmes and/or catchment management plans are in place for just over half the Review's participants. Consents for stormwater discharge are even less widespread. Only eight participants had all stormwater discharges consented. Most commonly, participants had consents for less than 10% of the network, and six participants had no stormwater discharge consents whatsoever.

In 2018, the Auditor-General reviewed the management of stormwater by three councils, to gain insights into how these councils were managing the risk of flooding in their communities. The councils reviewed were Dunedin City Council, Porirua City Council, and Thames-Coromandel District Council. One of the main conclusions was that the three councils had a reactive approach to understanding flood risk, by relying mostly on the information collected after a flood. The lack of forecasting could lead to a poor understanding of the risk and cost of future events, and inadequate preparation. The review also noted that the three councils were spending less than the annual depreciation amount on re-investment in stormwater systems, and that under-investment could lead to stormwater systems failing to contain and minimise flooding.

In the summary of findings, the Auditor-General noted that all councils face challenges when managing their stormwater systems, including ageing infrastructure, limited capacity, managing costs to the community, and having the right people and skills in their organisations. The main recommendations concern the need for improved investment decision making, based upon better information about flood risks, and the performance and capacity of stormwater assets.

== See also ==
- Water in New Zealand
- List of water supply and sanitation by country
