= Local Government Act 2002 =

Act of Parliament in New Zealand

New Zealand Parliament
- Assented to: 24 December 2002
- Commenced: 1 July 2003

Legislative history
- Introduced by: Sandra Lee
- Passed: 7 December 2002

Amended by
- 2006

Related legislation
- Local Government Act 1974; Local Electoral Act 2001
- Status: Current legislation

The Local Government Act 2002 (sometimes known by its acronym, LGA) is an act of New Zealand's Parliament that defines local government in New Zealand. There are 73 territorial authorities (districts and cities), each with an elected mayor and elected councillors.

== History ==
Local government in New Zealand derives its powers from statute rather than from any constitutional authority, there being no formal written constitution. Its origins can be found in the Municipal Corporations Act (1876), and it was built on the principle of ultra vires and that local government (the same as companies) can only do those things it is specifically authorised to do, and can not do anything it is not authorised to do.

This requirement to have specific legislative authorisation resulted in a hodge podge of amendments to the local government legislation. For example, one of the former Local Government Act 1974's highly prescriptive provisions was section 663, which gave councils a statutory power to install, light and maintain a town clock. It is said that by the mid-1990s, the 1974 act rivalled the country's income tax legislation in terms of size and complexity. With over 100 amendments, the 1974 act became significantly complex as a result of 1950s and 60s prescriptive planning, overlaid with 1990s accountability and financial provisions, with a complicated numbering system. One of the reasons for the ultra vires approach was specifically to limit the potential for local government to compete with private enterprise.

In December 1999, Sandra Lee was appointed Local Government Minister in the newly formed Labour and Alliance coalition government. Responding to a groundswell of now coordinated unhappiness and pressure that had been building since the formation of the Local Government New Zealand association in 1996, Lee oversaw a rewrite of the Local Government Act 1974 so that it was readable to the general public and addressed matters that had come up in the intervening 28 years.The drafting of the legislation was not complete before the 27 July 2002 general election. Chris Carter was appointed Local Government Minister following the 2002 general election and oversaw the final drafting and passage of the legislation. Jeanette Fitzsimons, co-leader of the Green Party, was appointed chairperson of the select committee.

The Local Government Act 2002 brought about a total change in empowering local bodies. It changed from the ultra vires approach to a more permissive approach that gave local authorities "full capacity to carry on or undertake any activity or business, do any act, or enter into any transaction".

The act included a focus on sustainability with the reference to the 'four well-beings' social, economic, environmental and cultural. The purpose of the act is (a) to enable democratic decision-making and action by, and on behalf of, communities; and (b) to promote the social, economic, environmental, and cultural well-being of communities, in the present and in the future. The Local Government Act 2002 received royal assent on 24 December 2002.

== Consultation ==
The special consultative procedure (SCP) is a key part of the Local Government Act 2002 which must be used when changes to the long-term plan (LTP) are to be made. SCP is triggered by the significance policy stated in the LTP and even changes to the significance policy must happen by way of SCP.

All by-law introductions, amendments or omissions are made using the SCP. The SCP is used when changes in level of service happen in the LTP or when significance levels are reached of a percentage of revenue, or a few people are affected a greatly or many people are affected generally by the proposal. By-law changes and updates must happen under the SCP provisions in preparation for all by-laws being through the SCP by 30 June 2008.

All by-laws must keep current and be not older than 10 years without an SCP taking place to keep by-laws current. Transparency in the processes of council is facilitated by the SCP safeguards in the act. New Zealand's local and regional authority will have its first full LTP, with community outcomes, complete from each district by 31 July 2006 when they will be required to have passed through the SCP and be lodged in the Parliamentary Library in Wellington. Once this process is complete the use of the SCP will become regularly used in updating the LTP and any major changes that happen to come along.

In SCP a statement of proposal and a summary of the statement of proposal is a required to go out for community feedback. The draft full document requires not less than one month for public submissions to be sent into council. This submission can be heard in person if the submitter wishes, and full council listens and consults on all submissions in making a decision over the draft proposal. Once passed the document is no longer draft and the SCP requirement has been satisfied.

In consultation outside the SCP which happens with the community outcomes process, the principles of consultation remain the same as stated in the act and are a major focus of all consultation with the community in local government under the Local Government Act 2002.

=== Community outcomes ===
Community outcomes—under section 91 of the act—are statements that are derived from full consultation with stakeholders in the community and happen at least once every six years. Each district and region has community outcomes that the community has decided upon. Community outcomes are a requirement of the Local Government Act 2002.

By 31 July 2006 the long-term council community plans 2006–2016 will be in the Parliamentary Library for 86 territorial authorities. The community outcomes will be printed in this document for each area. It was optional until 2006 and now community outcomes are a must. Eleven LTA did not comply with pre-audit requirements and whether they will make the deadline is not yet known. Three others will not have sign off by full council by 30 June 2006 and this will have spending implications for the councils until sign off does happen.

=== Measures and indicators ===
Section 92 of the Local Government Act 2002 requires measures and indicators, not less than once every 3 years, on the progress of the community towards the community outcomes is reported. Debate around whether it is from a regional perspective or from the location of the community outcome area perspective will take a number of years and three yearly cycles to resolve.

It is suggested that the Minister's intent at the time of drafting the act was clearly for it to be locally focused. A local focus to support the people who develop the community outcomes to self determine what is best for the area in which they live and work.

The name of this document or report is the state of the district report (SOD). Baseline reports are being made by some councils before to measure progress by. An example of a good local authority baseline SOD is the South Waikato District Council State of the District Report.

=== Long-term plan ===
The Local Government Act 2002 required that an initial ten-year long-term plan for the period 2004–2014 be prepared by all the local and regional councils of New Zealand.

Next in the LGA was a consultation process to identity the community outcomes of the district. The community outcomes did not belong to the council, but were a community's district outcomes. The LGA stated that a subsequent LTP for the period 2006–2016 was required to have the district's community outcomes included at this time. The community outcome progress is reported at least every three years and at least once every six years the full round of consultation to identify the community outcomes must happen. Each LTP is audited by the Auditor General every three years.

Prior to an amendment to the LGA in 2022, the long-term plan was known as a long-term council community plan (LTCCP).

=== State of the district report ===
Progress of the community in their community outcomes are to be reported at least once every three years with the first deadline having been 2009. The report of this community progress can be known as the state of the district report. Measures and indicators to this end are developed around measurement and reporting on progress to the community outcomes. A whole science is developing around where the attribution of outputs lies with regards to the outcomes being advanced. The question in the state of the district report is which part of the community's outputs contribute to the community outcomes and by how much if any.

== Bylaws ==
Bylaws are required to be consulted upon using the special consultative procedure in the Local Government Act 2002. All bylaws must be consulted with by the community by 30 June 2008. No bylaws may be older than 10 years without needing to return to the community again for consultation.

== Management ==
The act sought to distance the elected council members and mayor from the day-to-day operations and management of the local authority. It created a position, the chief executive, with this person being the only council appointee. The chief executive reports to the council and mayor, and in turn appoints all other council staff, who report to him/her, not directly to the council.

This was done so as to encourage the council members and mayor to focus on higher level issues of setting strategic direction and policy, while allowing a professional cadre of managers to then implement council policy.

The chief executive is appointed for a five-year term. At the expiry of the five years, the council can either appoint the chief executive for a two-year extension, or advertise the position on the open market. If the chief executive's tenure is extended by two years, at the end of the two-year extension, the position must then be advertised on the open market.

When the chief executive position is advertised on the open market, anyone can apply and be considered for the position, including the incumbent chief executive. Whoever is appointed will then have a new five-year term, with possibly a two-year extension, and so on.

The council is required to disclose the remuneration paid to the chief executive in their annual report.

== Rates ==
Local authorities have considerable flexibility in how they can raise revenue, with such levies generally being described as 'rates'. There is a noted lack of uniformity between the different authorities as to how these rates are levied.

To match the new Local Government Act of 2002, a separate piece of legislation was passed, the Local Government (Rating) Act 2002. This specifies the types of rates that can be levied, and the types of land and property on which rates can be levied (and what is exempt from such levies). It took effect generally from 1 July 2003.

In August 2006 the Government agreed to have an independent enquiry on the matter of local government rates. This reported back in July 2007. Additional analysis was published by the Department of Internal Affairs in 2011.

== Local elections ==
Local government elections occur every three years under the Local Electoral Act 2001. The most recent round of local elections was held in October 2022, with voting papers sent out from mid-September. The next will be October 2025.

The 2007 elections were the first conducted where the community outcomes are fully integrated into the long-term plan and audited for this purpose. All territorial authorities must have community outcomes printed and integrated into their 2006–2016 long-term plans.

== Sources ==
- Dollery, Brian; Garcea, Joseph; LeSage, Edward C. (1 January 2008), Local Government Reform: A Comparative Analysis of Advanced Anglo-American Countries, Edward Elgar Publishing, ISBN 978-1-78254-386-2
