= Hutt Park railway station =

Hutt Park railway station may refer to:

- Hutt Park railway station, Gracefield, a closed railway station on the Gracefield Branch line in New Zealand
- Hutt Park railway station, Petone, a closed railway station on the Hutt Park Railway in New Zealand
