= Beach railway station, Lower Hutt =

Defunct railway station in New Zealand

Beach

General information
- Coordinates: 41°13′28.25″S 174°51′32.68″E
- System: New Zealand Government Railways Department
- Owner: Hutt Park Railway Company
- Line: Hutt Park Railway
- Platforms: None
- Tracks: Branch line (1)

Construction
- Parking: No

History
- Opened: 6 February 1885
- Closed: 19 November 1915 (Victoria Street); 31 January 1950 (Beach)
- Former names: Petone Junction, Petone Beach
Location

Beach railway station was a station on the privately owned but government operated Hutt Park Railway in Petone, a suburb of the city of Lower Hutt in the Wellington region of New Zealand’s North Island. It was located at the junction of the Wairarapa Line and the Hutt Park Railway, a short distance south of the government-owned Petone railway station.

It was established by the privately held Hutt Park Railway Company to serve race trains between Wellington and the Hutt Park Racecourse, and was intended to be used by patrons living in the vicinity, as well as those wishing to connect with government run services on the Wairarapa Line.

== History ==
The station saw its first traffic on 6 February 1885 when the inaugural race trains on the Hutt Park Railway were run to a meeting of the Wellington Racing Club at the racecourse.

Facilities provided were always meagre, initially consisting simply of some levelled ground next to the railway line, a ticket booth, and a telephone. By 1895 the alignment of the junction of the Hutt Park Railway with the Wairarapa Line had been altered, moving the line closer to the shoreline and thus also the station. A missive from the Traffic Manager on 6 February 1895 noted that the ground at the station site was no longer even which could result in passenger injuries and thus land the Railways Department with liability for any mishaps. An improved ticket booth and telephone office was also requested. There were several other requests for improvements, including for the construction of a platform, largely without success. However, the Traffic Manager noted on 11 March 1896 that the company had erected a new ticket booth at the station site, and that he considered the line suitable for working race traffic.

The unwillingness of the company to make any further improvements to the station resulted in a request of the District Traffic Manager on 15 November 1897 to have race day trains stop at the foot of Victoria Street as an alternative to the Beach station. The ground beside the line at this location was far more suitable for disembarkation, and it was felt that this move would be much more convenient for Petone passengers, and also advantageous for the Railways Department, obviating the need to stop trains on a grade and curve. The request was approved on 18 November, affecting services run for the next race meetings on the 24th and 26th of the same month. This marked the end of the use of Beach station for passenger trains though it continued to exist for signalling purposes until closure in 1950.

A ticket booth was erected at the Victoria Street site to handle passengers for the race trains and remained in use until the line was abandoned by the company. By late 1910 the ticket booth had been overturned and destroyed, resulting in a request from the Petone Borough Council for its removal. Though race trains had ceased using the line several years earlier, Victoria Street remained an official stopping place until 1915.

== See also ==
- Hutt Park Railway
- Hutt Park Railway Station, Petone
