= Steeledale =

- Location within Gauteng Location within South Africa
- Coordinates: 26.246°S 28.096°E
- Country: South Africa
- Province: Gauteng
- Municipality: City of Johannesburg
- Main Place: Johannesburg

Area
  - Total: 0.32 km^{2} (0.12 sq mi)

Population (2011)
  - Total: 4
  - Density: 13/km^{2} (32/sq mi)

Racial makeup (2011)
  - Black African: 75.0%
  - White: 25.0%

First languages (2011)
  - Sotho: 50.0%
  - Afrikaans: 25.0%
  - Tswana: 25.0%
- Time zone: UTC+2 (SAST)
- Postal code (street): 2197

Steeledale is an industrial suburb of Johannesburg, South Africa. It is located in Region F of the City of Johannesburg Metropolitan Municipality.
