= Gracefield, New Zealand =

Industrial suburb of Lower Hutt, New Zealand

Gracefield
- Suburb
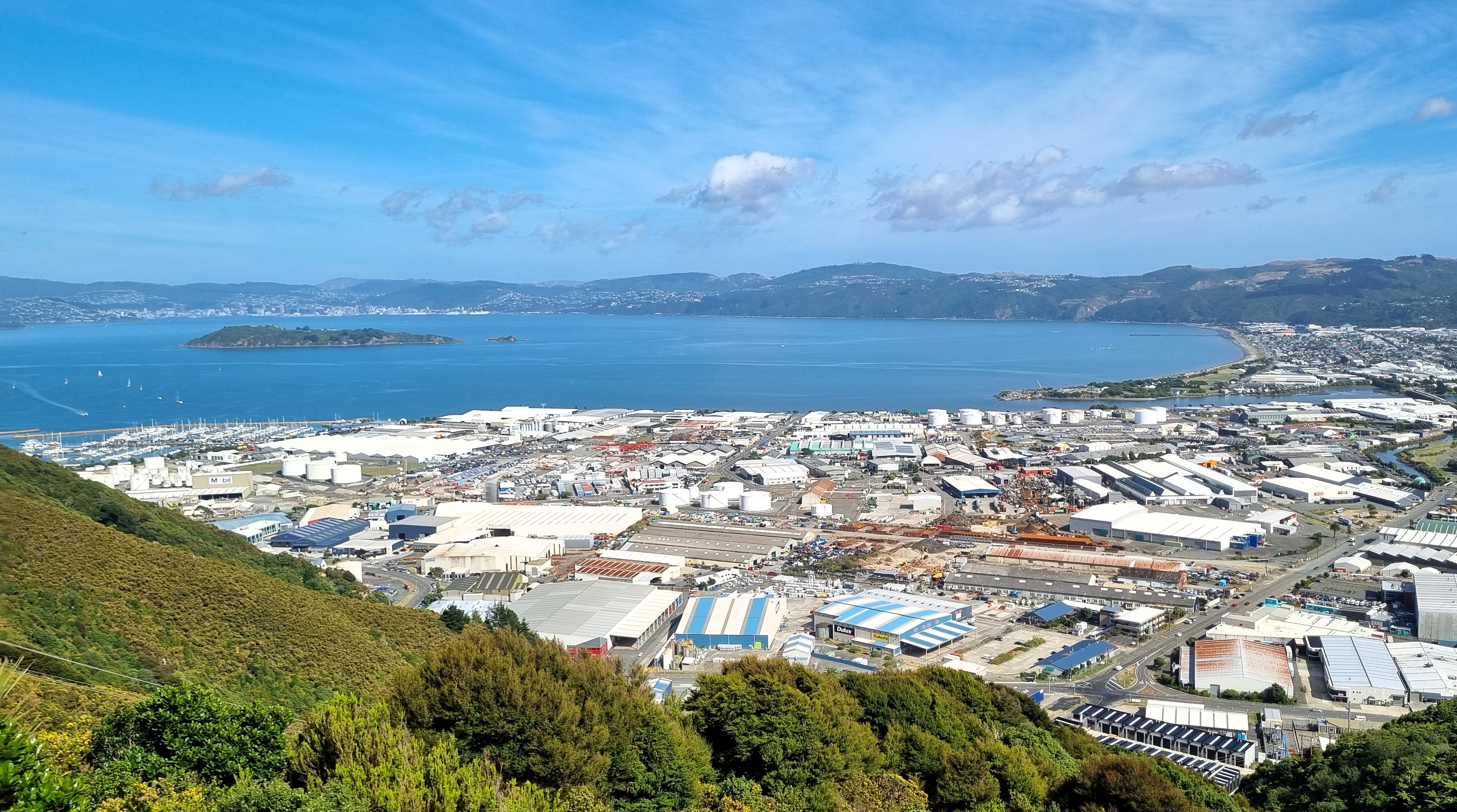
- Gracefield (near), Seaview and Wellington Harbour
- Interactive map of Gracefield
- Coordinates: 41°14′S 174°55′E
- Country: New Zealand
- City: Lower Hutt
- Local authority: Hutt City Council
- Electoral ward: Harbour

Area
  - Land: 375 ha (930 acres)

Population (June 2025)
  - Total: 100
  - Density: 27/km^{2} (69/sq mi)

Woburn	Waiwhetū
	Gracefield
Seaview

Gracefield is an industrial suburb of Lower Hutt City, located at the bottom of the North Island of New Zealand.

Up until the 1980s, Gracefield and neighbouring Petone were home to woollen mills, railway workshops, car assembly and meat processing plants. When protective tariffs were lifted in the mid-1980s, many of these industries ceased.

The headquarters and principal laboratories of Callaghan Innovation are in Gracefield, in premises developed largely from the Physics and Engineering Laboratory of DSIR.

== Demographics ==
Gracefield statistical area covers 3.75 km^{2} (1.45 sq mi) and includes Seaview. It had an estimated population of 100 as of June 2025, with a population density of 27 people per km^{2}.

Historical population
Year	Pop.	±% p.a.
2006	75	—
2013	99	+4.05%
2018	141	+7.33%
2023	102	−6.27%

Gracefield had a population of 102 in the 2023 New Zealand census, a decrease of 39 people (−27.7%) since the 2018 census, and an increase of 3 people (3.0%) since the 2013 census. There were 60 males and 45 females in 63 dwellings. 5.9% of people identified as LGBTIQ+. The median age was 48.3 years (compared with 38.1 years nationally). There were 12 people (11.8%) aged under 15 years, 9 (8.8%) aged 15 to 29, 60 (58.8%) aged 30 to 64, and 21 (20.6%) aged 65 or older.

People could identify as more than one ethnicity. The results were 76.5% European (Pākehā); 26.5% Māori; 2.9% Pasifika; and 8.8% Middle Eastern, Latin American and African New Zealanders (MELAA). English was spoken by 97.1%, Māori by 8.8%, and other languages by 8.8%. No language could be spoken by 2.9% (e.g. too young to talk). The percentage of people born overseas was 17.6, compared with 28.8% nationally.

Religious affiliations were 20.6% Christian, 2.9% Māori religious beliefs, and 2.9% New Age. People who answered that they had no religion were 58.8%, and 11.8% of people did not answer the census question.

Of those at least 15 years old, 15 (16.7%) people had a bachelor's or higher degree, 48 (53.3%) had a post-high school certificate or diploma, and 30 (33.3%) people exclusively held high school qualifications. The median income was $48,900, compared with $41,500 nationally. 9 people (10.0%) earned over $100,000 compared to 12.1% nationally. The employment status of those at least 15 was 51 (56.7%) full-time and 9 (10.0%) part-time.

== History ==
Gracefield is named for parliamentarian Morgan Grace, who owned land (Gracefield Estate) in the area in the 19th century. At this time Gracefield was an area of farms and orchards. Grace's son Francis Grace was chairman of the board of directors of the Gracefield Syndicate, a company formed in 1907 to purchase over 200 acres of land at Gracefield to subdivide for leasing.

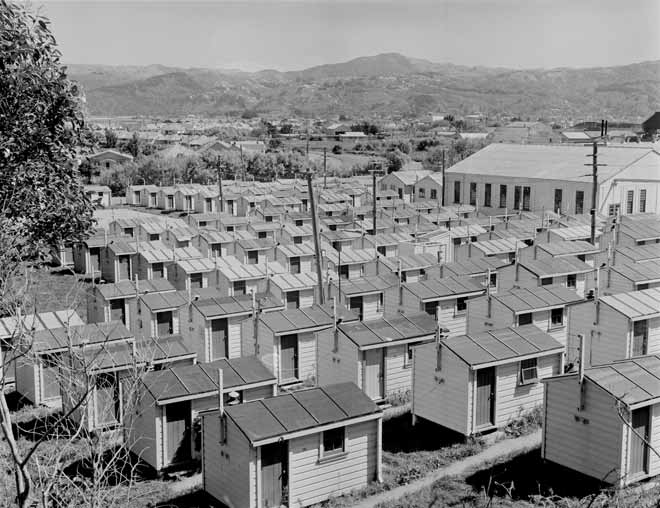
Huts for immigrant workers, 1954

A short industrial railway line, known as the Gracefield Branch, used to run through Gracefield. The line from Woburn, opened in 1929, was extended into Gracefield in 1943 and a freight terminus established there. This was later extended to a network of sidings serving industries in Seaview. In 1972 a new freight depot was opened at Gracefield. In 1981 the goods facilities at Lower Hutt Station were closed, and goods handling was transferred to a new facility at Gracefield. Gracefield Yard was closed on 30 April 2002, and the tracks are now mothballed.

Between 1949 and the 1980s, a workingmen's camp existed near the Wainuiomata Hill Road at the base of the hill. The camp was built by the government, and in the 1950s housed 200 mostly immigrant men who were working on the electrification of the Hutt railway line. In the 1970s, the camp housed groups of up to 100 Tongans brought to Lower Hutt on six-month work schemes by the Hutt Valley Chamber of Commerce, to alleviate a shortage of local workers. The huts were removed in 1988.

=== Feltex ===
By the mid-1930s a flock mill operated by John Grant and Company, a subsidiary of Felt and Textiles of Australia (Feltex), was established in Gracefield Road. In 1940 Feltex expanded the business with a new 50,000 sq ft factory nearby, intending to manufacture carpet and all types of felt for slippers, millinery, saddle linings, floor coverings and engineering purposes. The factory employed more than 200 men and shortly after opening was producing up to 5000 yards of felt and 1800 yards of carpet each week. During 2002 and 2003 the Feltex factory at Bell Road was expanded, becoming the biggest yarn spinning operation in the Feltex group. Feltex was bought by Geoffrey Hirst Pty in 2006, and as of 2024 the Bell Road factory in Gracefield still operates under this brand name.

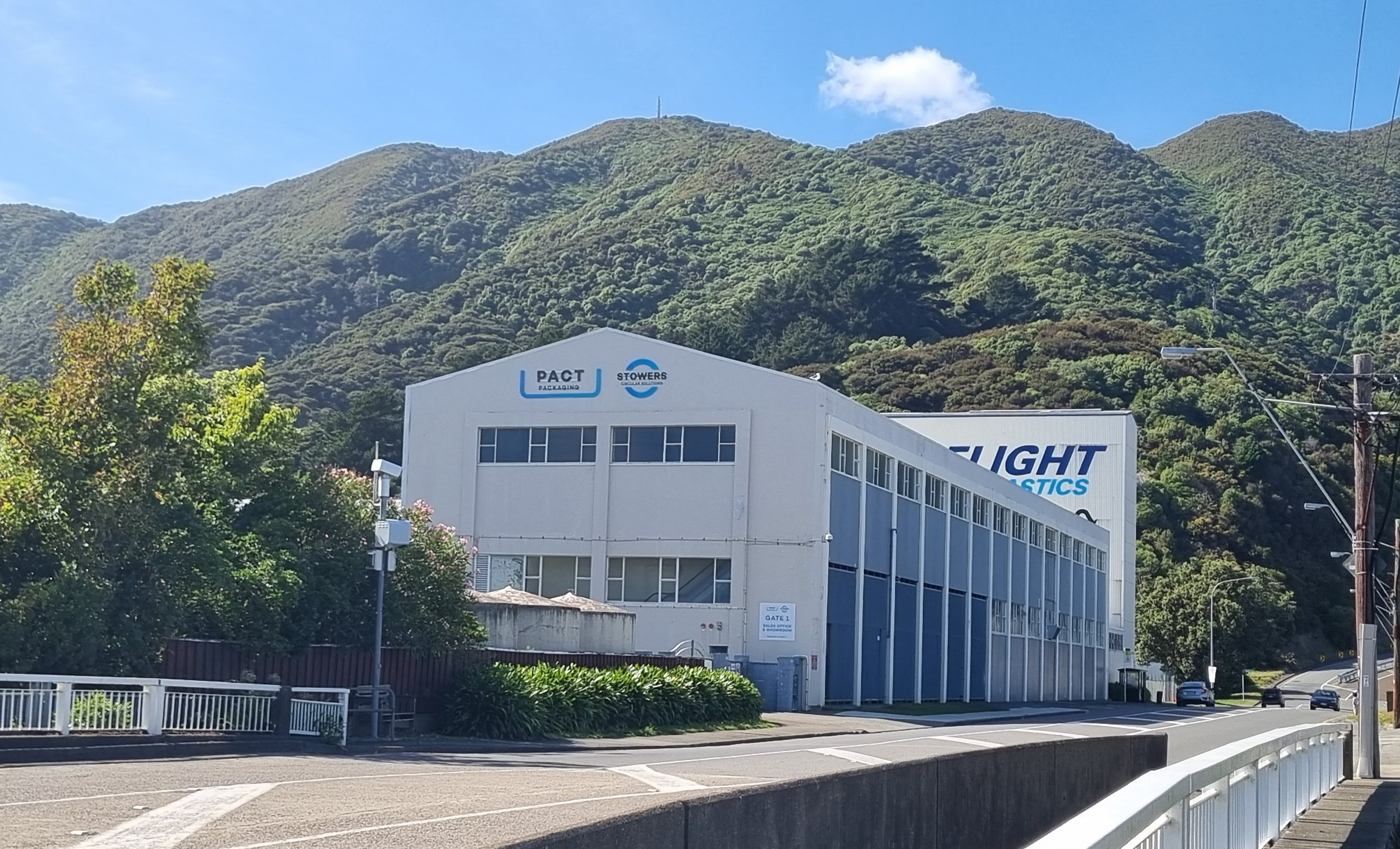
The former Griffin's factory at Wainui Road

=== Griffin's Factory ===
Griffin's Food Company built a factory on a five and a half acre site at the northern end of Gracefield in 1938, with the first biscuits being produced in January 1939. The building was constructed of reinforced concrete and had a sawtooth roof to provide good lighting. The factory buildings surrounded a courtyard with lawn, a fountain and flowers. There were also extensive flower gardens around the complex, which led the factory to be known as 'The Garden Factory'. The factory had an automatic conveyor belt oven about 100 feet long, the first of its kind in the southern hemisphere, which was in operation until the factory closed in 2008. In 1939, two thirds of the approximately 90 staff were women: this "bevy of skilful girls in neat smocks" could process 20 tons of biscuits per week. Griffin's closed the factory in 2008, with the loss of 200 jobs, and the building became a plastics recycling factory.

=== DSIR / Callaghan Innovation ===
The Department of Scientific and Industrial Research (DSIR) bought 16 acres of land at Gracefield in June 1942 and moved its Physical Testing Laboratory into a new building there in December that year. The Dominion Physical Laboratory had around 80 staff working on radar, metrology and war work. A second building was built at the site in 1946. In 1958 the government approved a new branch of the DSIR, the Institute of Nuclear Sciences (now part of GNS Science), and it was decided to base this at Gracefield too. The DSIR was disbanded in 1992 and its various departments formed into Crown Research Institutes, many of which (or their successors) still have a presence in Gracefield. Callaghan Innovation, formed partly from Industrial Research Limited, a Crown Research Institute, was established at Gracefield in 2013, with the task of making New Zealand business more innovative. Callaghan Innovation set up the Gracefield Innovation Quarter, which brought together scientists, technicians and businesses in a collection of laboratories, workshops, pilot labs, office space and a centre for Māori businesses on one large site.

== Wainuiomata Hill Road ==
The Wainuiomata Hill Road provides the only road access to the valley and suburb of Wainuiomata. The Lower Hutt side of the road is reached via one of two approach roads in Gracefield: Wainui Road or Gracefield Road. The Hill Road was opened in 1860 and has undergone many upgrades since then. A speed camera installed at the base of the hill in Wainui Road near the Griffin's factory has a notorious reputation, as it is installed right where motorists begin to accelerate for the steep climb up the hill, or are at the end of the last downhill stretch. A shared cycling and walking path over the hill was completed in 2019. Near the bottom of the Lower Hutt side, part of the path splits from the road and a section for cyclists only runs downhill, ending at Gracefield Road.

== Wainuiomata Tunnel ==
The Wainuiomata Tunnel was planned to improve access to the Wainuiomata Valley as part of a scheme to commence residential development there in the 1930s. The Lower Hutt side of the tunnel is located in Gracefield at the end of Tunnel Grove off Gracefield Road. Construction started in 1932 but was halted several years later when only partly completed due to a lack of funds brought about by economic depression. The tunnel was never opened to road traffic, and other than a brief stint of military service during World War II, remained unused until sold in 1975. Thereafter it was completed as a utility tunnel, initially carrying only a water pipe. Greater Wellington Regional Council is responsible for the tunnel, and also maintains the water supply pipe that runs through it. The tunnel also now carries a sewer pipeline and telecommunications cables.

== Waiwhetū Stream ==
The Waiwhetū Stream is a small watercourse that flows through Gracefield and drains the eastern side of the Hutt Valley. It enters Wellington Harbour at the Hutt River estuary. Development and urbanisation of the Hutt Valley since the arrival of settlers led to increasing pollution and degradation of the stream environment. The stream was diverted into concrete culverts in many sections in an attempt to reduce flooding. Industrial development in the area around the lower reaches of the stream led to that section becoming an industrial sewer. In 2010, the stream was described as one of the most polluted waterways in New Zealand.

Pressure from the community beginning around 2003 helped to trigger a major project to clean up the lower reaches. This project was declared complete in June 2010, after the removal of 56,000 tonnes of toxic waste. In 2010–11, a community group was formed to lead restoration of the upper reaches of the stream. Over a period of 10 years, volunteers cleared invasive aquatic weeds and rubbish from 6 kilometres (3.7 mi) of the stream bed and established around 34,000 locally sourced native plants on the banks of the stream.

== Climate ==
Climate data for Lower Hutt (Gracefield) (1981–2010)
Month	Jan	Feb	Mar	Apr	May	Jun	Jul	Aug	Sep	Oct	Nov	Dec	Year
Mean daily maximum °C (°F)	21.0 (69.8)	21.3 (70.3)	19.8 (67.6)	17.2 (63.0)	15.0 (59.0)	12.9 (55.2)	12.1 (53.8)	12.8 (55.0)	14.4 (57.9)	15.5 (59.9)	17.1 (62.8)	19.2 (66.6)	16.5 (61.7)
Daily mean °C (°F)	17.5 (63.5)	17.5 (63.5)	16.1 (61.0)	13.7 (56.7)	11.8 (53.2)	10.0 (50.0)	9.1 (48.4)	9.6 (49.3)	11.2 (52.2)	12.4 (54.3)	13.8 (56.8)	16.0 (60.8)	13.2 (55.8)
Mean daily minimum °C (°F)	14.0 (57.2)	13.6 (56.5)	12.4 (54.3)	10.2 (50.4)	8.6 (47.5)	7.0 (44.6)	6.1 (43.0)	6.4 (43.5)	8.1 (46.6)	9.3 (48.7)	10.6 (51.1)	12.7 (54.9)	9.9 (49.9)
Average rainfall mm (inches)	53.8 (2.12)	72.0 (2.83)	104.5 (4.11)	57.5 (2.26)	155.9 (6.14)	128.1 (5.04)	168.1 (6.62)	92.0 (3.62)	93.8 (3.69)	82.2 (3.24)	98.7 (3.89)	99.5 (3.92)	1,206.1 (47.48)
Source: NIWA

== Education ==
Gracefield School lies just to the west of the Waiwhetū Stream in the present-day suburb of Waiwhetū. It was built in 1939 in what was then considered part of Gracefield, due to rapid development in the area. It is a co-educational state primary school for Year 1 to 6 students, with a roll of 207 pupils as of October 2025.
