= Hutt Park railway station, Gracefield =

Defunct railway station in New Zealand

Hutt Park
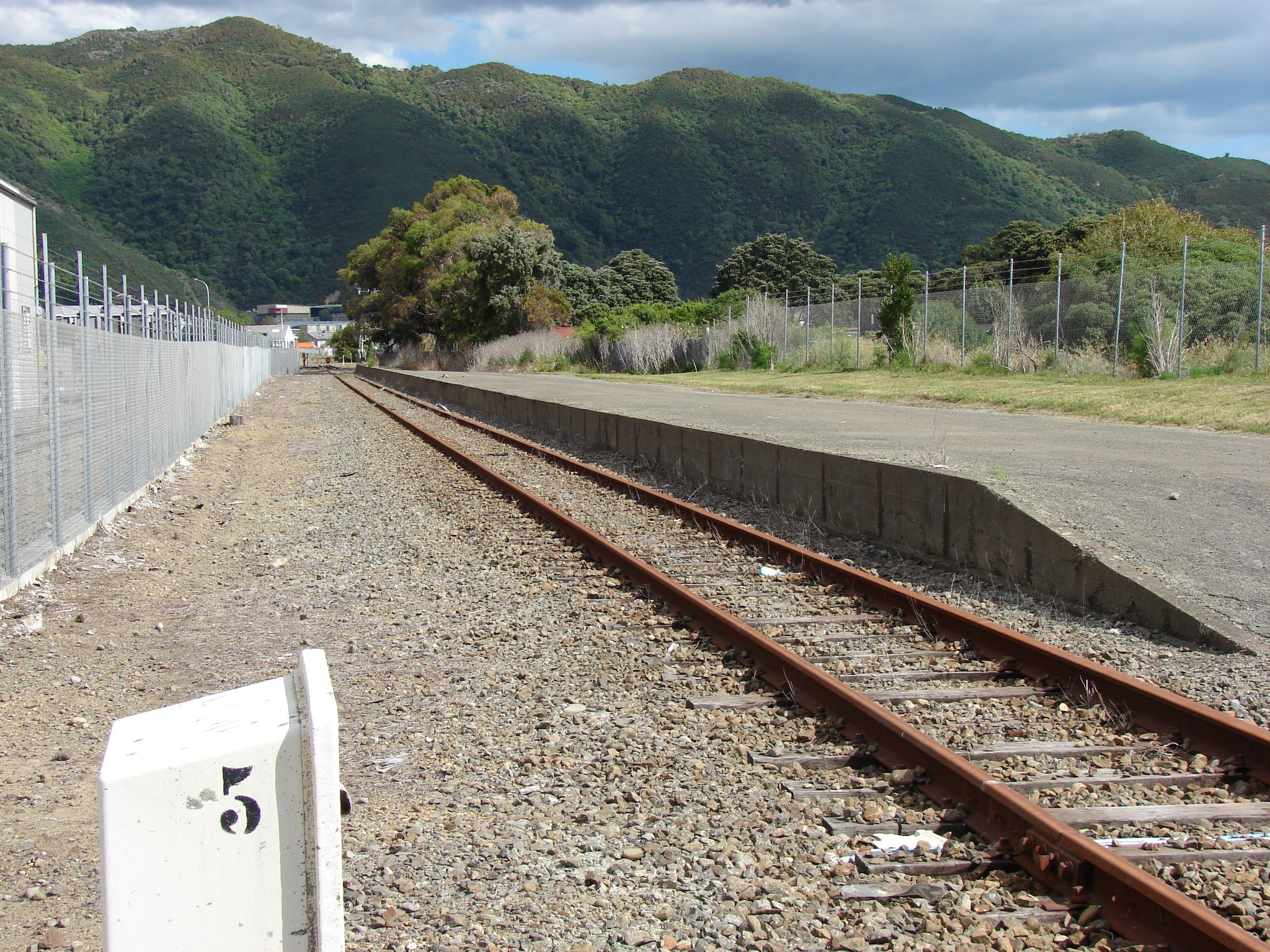
- Hutt Park railway station, looking south. The platform now borders private land and the Hutt Valley Golf Course on the mothballed section of the Gracefield Branch line past the Hutt Workshops.

General information
- Coordinates: 41°14′1.77″S 174°54′39.68″E
- System: New Zealand Government Railways Department suburban rail
- Owner: Railways Department
- Line: Gracefield Branch
- Platforms: Single side
- Tracks: Branch line (1)

Construction
- Parking: No

History
- Opened: 1927-09-17; 1960-02-27
- Closed: 1949-02-05; 1965-05-11
- Rebuilt: Jan-Feb 1960
- Electrified: 1960-02-27

Passengers
- 1960: 4263
- 1960-1961: 3107 ▼27.11%
- 1961-1962: 1714 ▼44.83%
- 1962-1963: 1649 ▼3.79%
- 1963-1964: 1233 ▼25.22%
- 1964-1965: 1022 ▼17.11%
Location

Hutt Park railway station was on the Gracefield Branch line in the Wellington region of New Zealand’s North Island, a terminus for passenger trains from Wellington. The station was behind the Hutt Park Raceway and opposite the Hutt Workshops.

Services consisted exclusively of trains for patrons of race meetings of the Wellington Trotting Club at the Hutt Park Racecourse. Picnic trains were run occasionally to Woburn station for excursionists whose ultimate destination was the Hutt Park, who were conveyed by bus or walked to the park.

== History ==
There were two distinct eras of operation for the Hutt Park railway station. The first covered steam-hauled race trains until 1949, the second electric multiple units from 1960 to 1965.

=== Steam era ===
The site of the station was first used for race trains in 1927. The Wellington Trotting Club, which was holding four race meetings per year at the racecourse, had become concerned by reports that patrons had found it difficult to access the venue and sought to take advantage of the new Hutt Industrial Line (Gracefield Branch) that had been constructed to serve the new Hutt Workshops and ran behind the raceway. Since the cessation of race trains along the Hutt Park Railway line many years earlier, racecourse patrons had been making their way to the venue by direct bus or by train to Petone Station then bus.

On 12 April 1927 the club wrote to the Railways Department requesting that race trains be provided. They estimated that two trains per race meeting would be required from Lambton Station in Wellington to the back of the Hutt Park Racecourse via Whites Line Station (Woburn Station), starting with the first meeting of the 1927–1928 season which they expected would be held in early October.

The department considered the matter and responded on 27 August 1927 that it would be willing to operate the services. The line by this time had been laid as far as the Waiwetu Stream with ballasting expected to be completed prior to the first race meeting, and it was decided that the race trains would not interfere with other operations on the branch given the limited number of such services required. Though the department offered to clear the ground at the proposed stopping point, it was made clear to the club that the department would not be responsible for the installation of any additional services that may be required at the site should it prove to be inadequate. In particular, there were at the time no sidings at the site, limiting train operations and frequency, and neither was the department prepared to construct a platform for passengers.

The club accepted the terms offered, and proceeded to prepare the site to accept the race trains including the installation of entry gates to the raceway. Two trains each way per race day were to be run, with the outbound trains running 45 minutes apart, the return trains 20 minutes. The Railways Department charged a flat rate for travel to the raceway including admission, with the entrance fee being remitted to the club.

The inaugural trains ran to the first race meeting of the season on Saturday 17 September 1927. The special integrated ticketing offered by the Railways Department ensured that the trains remained well patronised for many years, so much so that on 30 May 1929 approval was given for the construction of a 6 ft (1.8 m) by 4 ft (1.2 m) building with seating for passengers at the site.

Increased use of the Gracefield Branch for shunting operations for Hutt Workshops necessitated a change in working practices on the line in 1929. Up to this time, race trains had been operated under Train Staff and Ticket regulations. The new method of train working for the line was to use these regulations from Woburn to the Hutt Workshops; the Line Clear Working method beyond. This required the installation of a telephone at Hutt Park to communicate with Woburn for the purposes of train control. It was proposed to construct a small shelter at Hutt Park for the telephone, but it was also noted that the telephone could be located in one of the workshops buildings along with the ticket apparatus.

Usage of the service eventually fell away, due mainly to increased use of road transport and decreased attendance at the race meetings, to the point where, in the 1940s, it was no longer economical to operate the trains. The last service ran to the race meeting on Saturday 5 February 1949. Following the cessation of race trains all facilities that had been installed at the site for the handling of race traffic were removed.

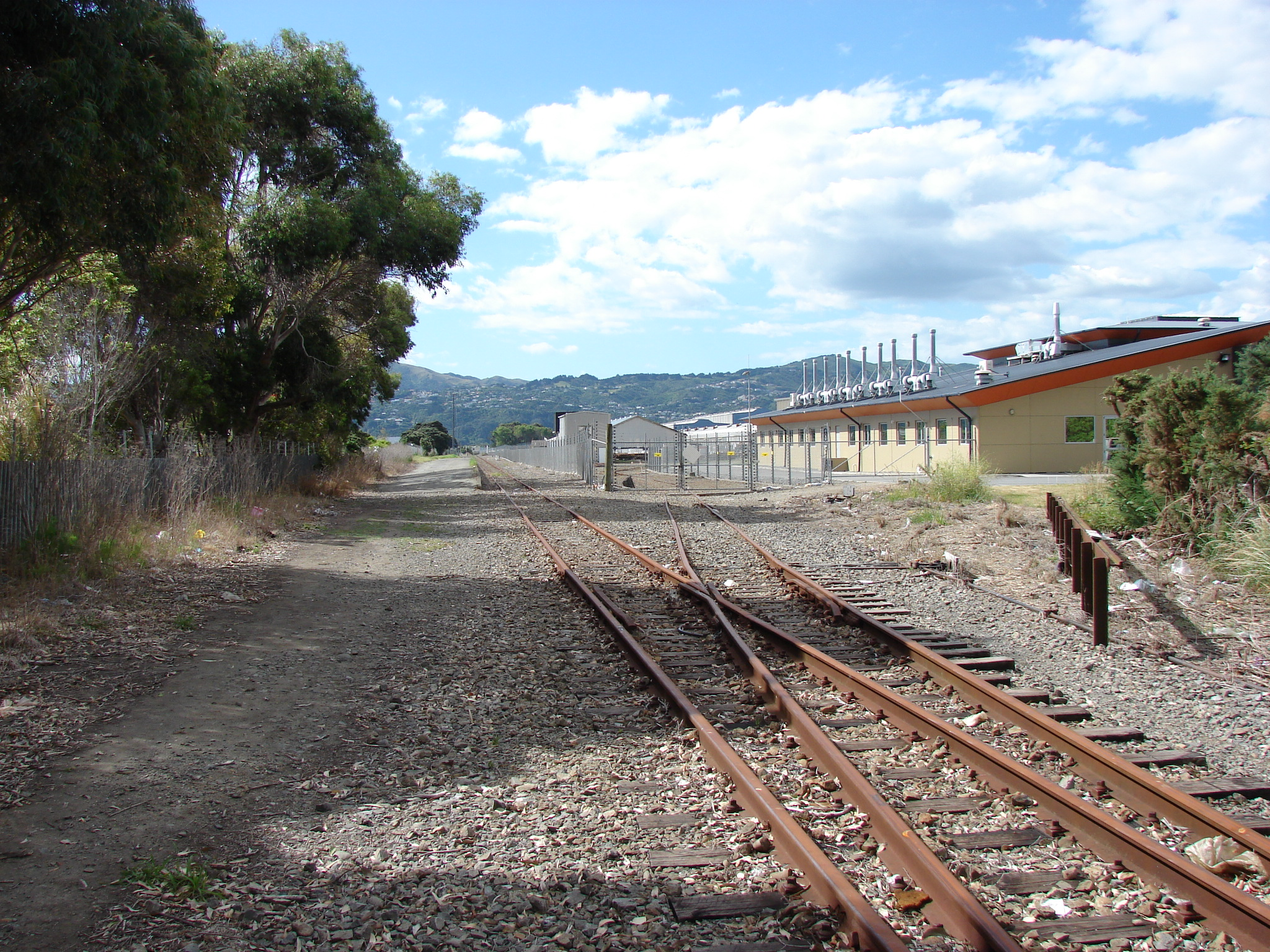
Hutt Park railway station from the south. Shown here, in addition to the Gracefield Branch line, is the southern entrance to the Hutt Workshops. It was here that the electrical overhead had to be extended to allow EMUs to access workshop sidings for the commencement of race trains in 1960.

=== Electric era ===
A decision by the Wellington Trotting Club to hold its race meetings at night from 1960 led to renewed interest in using trains to convey passengers to the meetings. It was expected that the new format would lead to increased and stable attendance, justifying the resumption of the race trains and the installation of new facilities at Hutt Park railway station site to handle the traffic.

The Railways Department preferred to use electric multiple unit trains rather than locomotive-hauled carriage trains. It expected that new facilities would have to be provided at the site, including an 8 ft (2.4 m) wide, 560 ft (170 m) long platform that would be capable of handling nine-car EMU trains; an extension of the electric overhead infrastructure to enable electric trains to use the workshops sidings; platform lighting; and access gates. The club had agreed to arrange for the access between the railway line and the race track, and to provide the necessary lighting, while the cost to the department was estimated to be £2,500. The club also had to arrange for the installation of three new raceway access stalls, and for the repair of the existing three stalls behind the platform, while the department had to arrange for the installation of a new service telephone and shelter for train control purposes.

Work on preparing the station for the first race meeting of the year on Saturday 27 February 1960 was well in hand early that year. On 26 January, the District Engineer requested that the Foreman of Works proceed with the construction of a platform at Hutt Park. The installation of a telephone and a walk-in shelter to house it were approved on 3 February, and a public address system for the platform was approved on 26 February. Two days before this meeting, on 25 February, an electric multiple unit train was run to Hutt Park to test the new facilities, including the recently finished platform. Other work completed for the first meeting included the installation of new access gates and the repair of old ones, and the installation of four pole-mounted electric platform lights.

As before the Railways Department sold integrated race meeting tickets, providing transport from either Wellington or Upper Hutt to the racecourse and admission. After disgorging their passengers at the platform, the trains moved forward and reversed into a workshops siding to await the return journey.

Patronage of the race trains for the first season, 1960, was considered disappointing, especially given the rosy projections from the club for attendance numbers and the exposure given to the service in the local media. 1,508 passengers travelled by train to the inaugural race meeting on 27 February, 272 to the 28 April meeting and the season ended with 491 passengers for the 7 May meeting. Five hundred passengers was considered to be the minimum for the race trains to break even, and the number of cars in the trains was reduced throughout the season as demand fell away.

One unusual service to Hutt Park occurred during the 1960-1961 racing season when a group of trotting enthusiasts convinced the Railways Department to operate a railcar service from Masterton for the meeting on Saturday 25 February 1961. Though private bus operators already provided a service between the Wairarapa and the racecourse, it was estimated that at least 88 people would avail themselves of the special railcar service. Though the actual patronage of this service was considered reasonable, it was only enough for the service to break even.

Once the 1960–1961 season had ended and the data for the special services to Hutt Park had been reviewed, there was a suggestion that the revenue from the services was so poor that no further such services should be run. It was decided that in order to minimise the losses they would operate from Woburn only, connecting with regular suburban services.

Further disappointing returns from the 1961–1962 season resulted in further cost-saving measures, including the elimination of the station officer at Hutt Park, with his duties becoming the responsibility of the guard on the train; elimination of the assistant guard position on the race train; and reduction of fares to match those offered by buses. These changes were approved for the 1962-1963 racing season on 1 August 1962.

Revenue from the 1962–1963 season was down compared with the preceding season. Despite this, special race meeting services were again approved for the 1963–1964 season, using the same arrangements as for the previous season, on 10 June 1963. The situation was repeated the following year when losses were again incurred but services were renewed for the 1964–1965 season on 25 May 1964.

Following a review of services to the racecourse after the 1964–1965 season, and in light of a continuing decline in both revenue and passengers, it was decided that no further trains would be run without a guarantee of revenue of between £30 and £35. As these guarantees were not forthcoming, the race trains run during the 1964–1965 season were the last scheduled trains to Hutt Park Station, with the last service to the final race meeting of the season on Tuesday 11 May 1965.

=== Proposals ===
A 1975 report from the Railways Department into the possibility of a rail link for Wainuiomata suggested a route that involved the extension of the Gracefield Branch line through a three-kilometre tunnel. The report mentioned various additional facilities that would be required to operate such a suburban service, including the need for a station in the Gracefield area. It is possible that had work on this proposed rail link proceeded that Hutt Park Station could have been considered for a role in the Wainuiomata suburban rail service.

== Today ==
The only remnant of the station today is the station platform that was installed in 1960 to serve the electric multiple unit race trains. All other facilities that were provided for the handling of race traffic have been removed.

Though passenger traffic and all regular services stopping at the station ceased in 1965, freight trains continued to pass the station when operating services between Gracefield Freight Terminal and Woburn until closure of the freight terminal in 2002.

== See also ==
- Gracefield Branch
- Hutt Workshops
