= Hutt Park railway station, Petone =

Defunct railway station in New Zealand

Hutt Park

General information
- Coordinates: 41°13′56″S 174°53′51″E
- System: New Zealand Government Railways Department
- Owner: Hutt Park Railway Company
- Line: Hutt Park Railway
- Platforms: Single side
- Tracks: Branch line (1); Siding (1)

History
- Opened: 6 February 1885
- Closed: 19 November 1915
- Former names: Pipe Bridge, Racecourse Platform

Passengers
- 1904: 15,800
Location

Hutt Park railway station was on the privately owned but government operated Hutt Park Railway in Petone, a suburb of the city of Lower Hutt in the Wellington region of New Zealand’s North Island. It was on the western bank of the Hutt River, adjacent to a bridge that carried pipes over the Hutt River, near present-day Waione Street.

The station was built for, and only ever handled, patrons for the Hutt Park Raceway who arrived on special race trains from Wellington. The station was only busy for several days a year during racing season, and operated between 1885 and 1906.

== History ==
The first passengers to arrive were those heading for the race meetings held by the Wellington Racing Club on 6 and 7 February 1885, with the line having been certified by the Chief Engineer the previous day.

Facilities initially provided included a 400 feet (120 m) long platform, a siding, and a small ticket office. Several complaints were made over the years about the inadequacy of these facilities, with one such missive in 1895 noting that the platform was in poor shape, a barrier on the pipe bridge was required to control the flow of passengers from the racecourse on to the platform, another siding with a 40 vehicle capacity was required to handle additional traffic, and the ticket office was not suitable. By March 1896 the company had installed a barrier on the bridge and laid a new 11-chain (730 ft; 220 m) long siding.

A dispute between the racing club and the Hutt Park Railway Company in 1904 over the fares being levied by the railway company and a move by the Wellington Racing Club to shift its operations to a new racecourse at Trentham contributed to the cessation of all traffic to this station by 1907.

== Operations ==
The Wellington Racing Club held up to ten meetings per racing season, with two trains being run each way to each of these meetings. After the arrival of the first train on a race day it was shunted into a siding at the station to allow for the second train to use the platform.

All trains were owned and operated by the Railways Department, who also sold combined tickets covering travel on the trains and admittance to the racecourse. In 1904, the fare was 4s 6d first class, 3s 6d second class, of which 1s was remitted to the racing club to cover admission and the remainder divided equally between the railway company and the Railways Department.

== Proposals ==
Consideration was given as early as 1895 to extending the railway over the Hutt River to near the entrance of Hutt Park Raceway. This would have involved the construction of a new Hutt Park station at the terminus, including two loop sidings; a barricade; fencing; entrance gates; ticket office; and a 600 feet (180 m) long platform. The siding at the current Hutt Park station would have been retained for race day operational requirements.

Discussions between the Wellington Racing Club and the Hutt Park Railway Company on this proposal had failed to produce an agreement that was satisfactory to both parties, and the racing club failed in its attempt to get the government to fund the extension. By September 1904 the racing club had abandoned all attempts to improve rail access to Hutt Park Raceway and was actively seeking to establish a new racecourse at Trentham.

== Today ==
No trace of the station remains; the site on which it once stood was developed as a commercial and industrial area in the 20th century. The pipe bridge that connected the station to the racecourse was replaced in the 1950s.

== See also ==
- Hutt Park Railway
- Hutt Park railway station, Gracefield
