= Industrial suburb =

An industrial suburb is a community, near a large city, with an industrial economy. These communities may be established as tax havens or as places where zoning promotes industry, or they may be industrial towns that become suburbs by urban sprawl of the nearby big city.

== List of industrial suburbs by country ==
=== Australia ===
==== Queensland ====
- Brendale
- Carole Park
- Eagle Farm
- Kunda Park
- Larapinta
- Rocklea

==== South Australia ====
- Dry Creek

==== Victoria ====
- Braeside
- Moolap
- Somerton
- Tottenham

==== Western Australia ====
- Kwinana Beach
- Welshpool

==== New South Wales ====
- Chullora

=== India ===
- Butibori
- Sanathnagar
- Kondapalli
- Panki, Kanpur

=== Ireland ===
- Baldonnel, County Dublin
- Raheen, County Limerick

=== New Zealand ===
==== Auckland ====
- Onehunga
- Penrose
- Rosebank
- Wynyard Quarter
- East Tāmaki

==== Christchurch ====
- Addington
- Hornby
- Sockburn
- Waltham
- Woolston

==== Dunedin ====
- Burnside

==== Lower Hutt ====
- Gracefield
- Seaview

==== Nelson ====
- Annesbrook

==== Rolleston ====
- Izone

=== United Kingdom ===
- Ancoats, Manchester
- Attercliffe, Sheffield
- Cowley, Oxford

=== United States ===
==== California ====
- Commerce
- Emeryville (historical)
- Industry
- Irwindale
- Pittsburg
- Santa Fe Springs
- Tiburon (historical)
- Vernon

==== Colorado ====
- Commerce City, Colorado
- Arvada

==== Florida ====
- Medley

==== Illinois ====
- Bedford Park
- Bensenville
- Cicero
- East St. Louis
- Elk Grove Village
- Hodgkins
- Maywood
- McCook
- North Chicago
- Park City
- Waukegan
- Zion

==== Indiana ====
- East Chicago
- Gary
- Hammond
- Whiting

==== Michigan ====
- Dearborn
- Delta Township
- Ecorse
- Pontiac
- River Rouge
- Sterling Heights
- Trenton
- Warren
- Wayne

==== New Jersey ====
- Paterson
- Secaucus (historical)
- Teterboro

==== New York ====
- Kenmore, NY

==== Ohio ====
- Fairborn

==== Texas ====
- Pasadena

== See also ==
- Industrial city
- Suburb
