= Gracefield Branch =

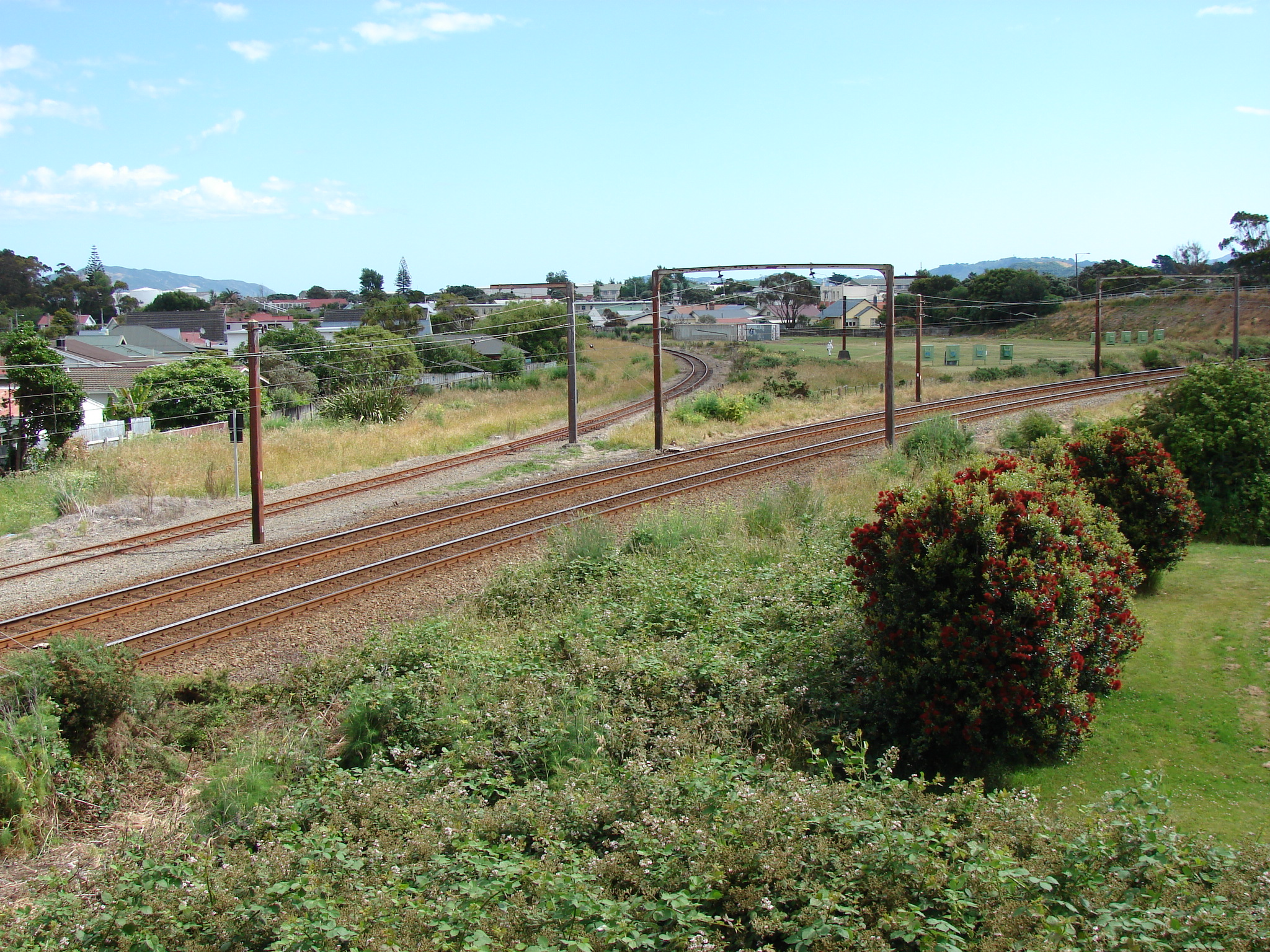
- The start of the Gracefield Branch, curving off to the left, just south of Woburn station. The double track curving right is the Wairarapa Line.

Overview
- Status: Open to Hutt Workshops (freight only), remainder mothballed
- Owner: ONTRACK
- Locale: Wellington, New Zealand
- Termini: Woburn; Hutt Workshops
- Stations: 1

Service
- Type: Industrial siding
- Operator(s): KiwiRail

History
- Opened: 1 April 1929

Technical
- Line length: 1.6 km (0.99 mi)
- Number of tracks: 1
- Character: Industrial
- Track gauge: 3 ft 6 in (1,067 mm)
- Electrification: 14 September 1953–1966 (Woburn–Hutt Park); 1966–1982 (Woburn–Gracefield)

The Gracefield Branch is a 1.6 km long, 3 ft 6 in (1,067 mm) gauge industrial line from its junction with the Wairarapa Line at Woburn in the Wellington region of New Zealand's North Island to its terminus at the southern end of the Hutt Workshops yard. The line formerly included an additional kilometre of track to Gracefield Freight Terminal, where it connected to a network of industrial sidings in nearby Seaview. Currently its only function is to provide access to the Hutt Workshops.

The line has been known by several names, including Hutt Park Line (1937), Hutt Industrial Line (1937), Gracefield Branch (1986), Gracefield Industrial Line (2001) and Gracefield Industrial Siding (2006). Its 1937 name led to confusion with the earlier Hutt Park Railway.

Map

== History ==
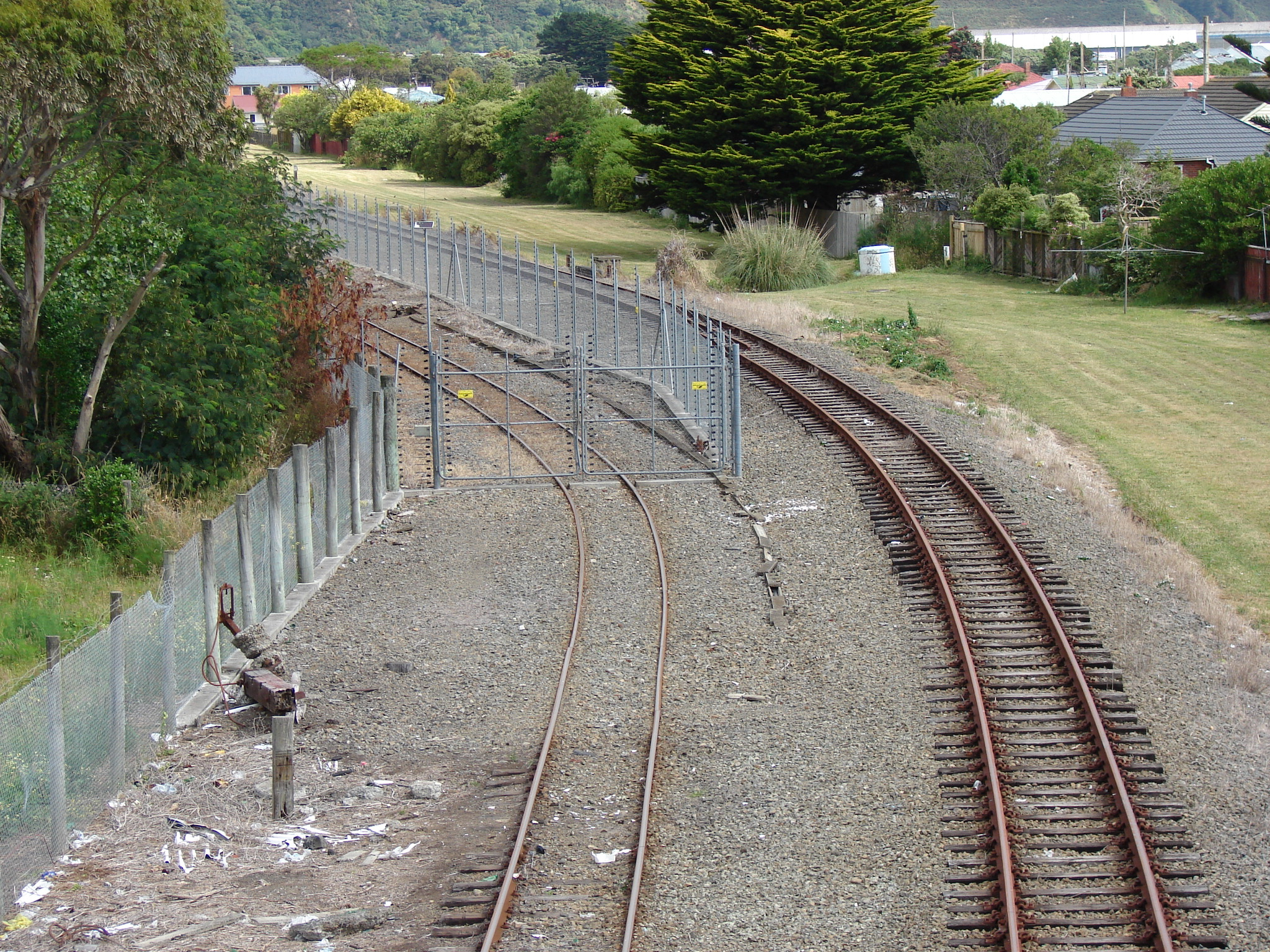
The Hutt Workshops road enters the fenced workshops yard (left), while the branch line (right) runs along the perimeter of the workshops yard.

Planning for the Gracefield Branch was included in surveys done for the Hutt Valley Branch line in 1924 and 1925. The line was intended to serve an area of 80 acres (32 ha) that had been purchased for the establishment of new railway workshops to replace those at Petone and an area at Gracefield intended for industrial development.

The line opened on 1 April 1929 and originally had one station, the terminus at Hutt Park. In 1943 the line was extended into Gracefield and a new terminus established there. Following land reclamation in the 1950s & 1960s, an extensive network of sidings was built at Seaview to serve industrial interests, including the Ford Motor Vehicle Assembly Plant; oil terminals for BP, Caltex, Europa and Shell; Pacific Scrap; and the Ministry of Works.

Electrification of the Woburn – Hutt Park section commenced in 1953 using the 1.5 kV DC overhead line system, coinciding with the electrification of the Wairarapa Line between Wellington and Taita. The catenary was extended slightly in 1959-60 to allow for EMUs running race trains to Hutt Park to use a workshops siding. A further extension of the catenary was opened in 1964 for goods trains to Gracefield Freight Terminal. Though there were no electric trains running on the branch from 1983 following the cessation of the workers' trains to the workshops, and the catenary and related electrification infrastructure were removed in 1990.

In 1972 a new Freight Depot was opened at Gracefield to relieve pressure on Lower Hutt Station (now Western Hutt) for small consignments. In 1981 the goods facilities at Lower Hutt Station were closed and the local goods shunts to Lower Hutt ceased. Goods handling was transferred to a new facility at Gracefield.

Gracefield Yard was closed on 30 April 2002. The industrial sidings at Seaview were lifted at about this time. Track between the Hutt Workshops and Gracefield has not been used since Gracefield Freight Terminal was closed, and is now mothballed.

== Operations ==
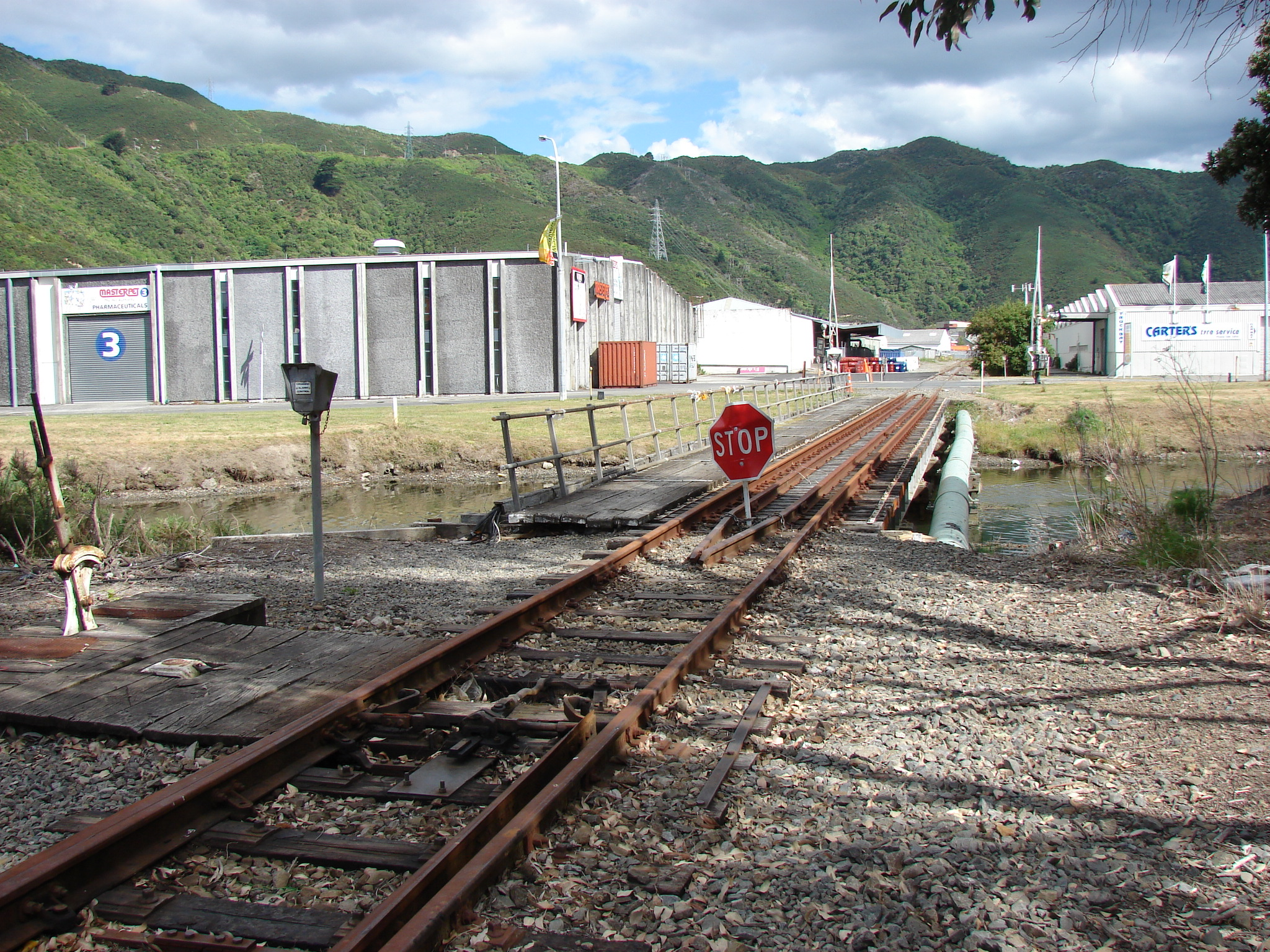
The end of operations on the Gracefield Branch, just before the Parkside Road level crossing. A road-style Stop sign has been used in place of the standard All Trains Stop board.

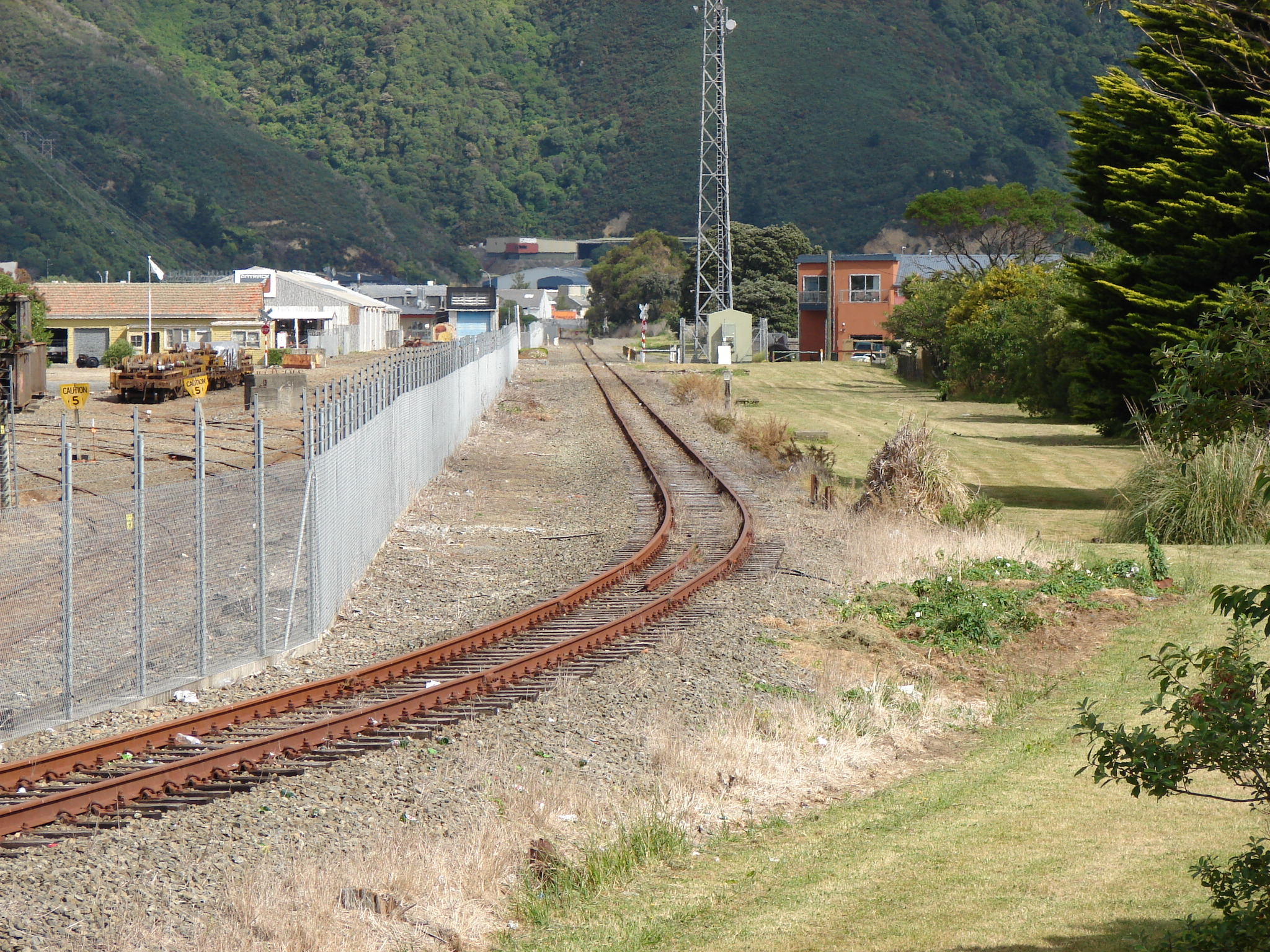
This part of the branch line, just shy of the Elizabeth Street level crossing, was used as a stopping place for the Hutt Workshops workers' trains.

From the time the line opened to the 1940s, steam trains were used to convey patrons to race meetings and picnics at the Hutt Park Raceway via Woburn. The race trains that had previously run to Hutt Park on the Hutt Park Railway had ceased operation in 1905. Race trains briefly resumed in the 1960s using DM/D class electric multiple units. These trains initially operated from both Upper Hutt and Wellington to Hutt Park, with the Wellington trains needing to reverse on to the branch at Woburn. Declining patronage led to the service being later reduced to Wellington – Hutt Park only, being withdrawn completely in 1965.

A twice-daily workers' train between Wellington and the Hutt Workshops conveyed railwaymen to and from work from the 1930s to December 1982, and was the last regular passenger service run on the line. These trains were locomotive-hauled, latterly usually by EW class electrics. The withdrawal of this service marked the end of electric train operations on the branch.

Though the motivation for extending the catenary in 1964 to the freight terminal was to allow for electric-hauled freight trains, such services seem to have been infrequent and even quite rare. Prior to the closure of the Gracefield yard, there was a regular shunting service (Q2) from the Gracefield Freight Terminal. The only regular traffic that currently uses the line is the Hutt Workshops shunt (Q4) which normally operates thrice weekly, with occasional special services.
