= Wellington Racing Club =

Horse racing club in New Zealand

Coordinates: 41°8′21.50″S 175°2′43.84″E

The Wellington Racing Club (WRC) is a racing horse racing club based at Trentham Racecourse in Trentham, Wellington, New Zealand.

Founded as the Wellington Jockey Club in 1854, the first race meetings held by the club were at Hutt Park in 1854 and at Burnham Water on the Miramar Peninsula.

The Club first ran its signature competition, the Wellington Cup, in 1867. The name of the club was changed to the Wellington Racing Club in 1879, to denote its status as Wellington's premier racing club. The next year the totalisator was used at Hutt Park for the first time. The Hutt Hack Racing Club also held races at Hutt Park. Arguments over the shortcomings of Hutt Park as the racecourse for the capital city came to a head in 1903 when the New Zealand Railways Department refused to improve the transport to the course. It was served by the Hutt Park Railway, which had been opened in 1885, but a new line following a similar alignment to the present day Hutt Valley Line and the Gracefield Branch would have provided better access.

In 1903 the Club conceived the idea of building a new course at Trentham. The new Trentham Racecourse held its first meeting on 20 January 1906. It was appropriate that at the first meeting Ropa won the Wellington Cup in 2 min 33 sec, then a New Zealand record for a mile and a half. Three stands were built between 1922 and 1924.

In 1994, the Club leased part of its former properties to Hutt International Boys' School.

== See also ==
- Thoroughbred racing in New Zealand for tables containing recent winners of major Wellington and other New Zealand thoroughbred races
- Wellington Cup
- New Zealand Oaks
- Thorndon Mile
- Captain Cook Stakes
- Trentham Stakes
- Levin Classic
- Desert Gold Stakes
