= Seaview, Lower Hutt =

Coordinates: 41.241°S 174.906°E

Seaview
- Suburb
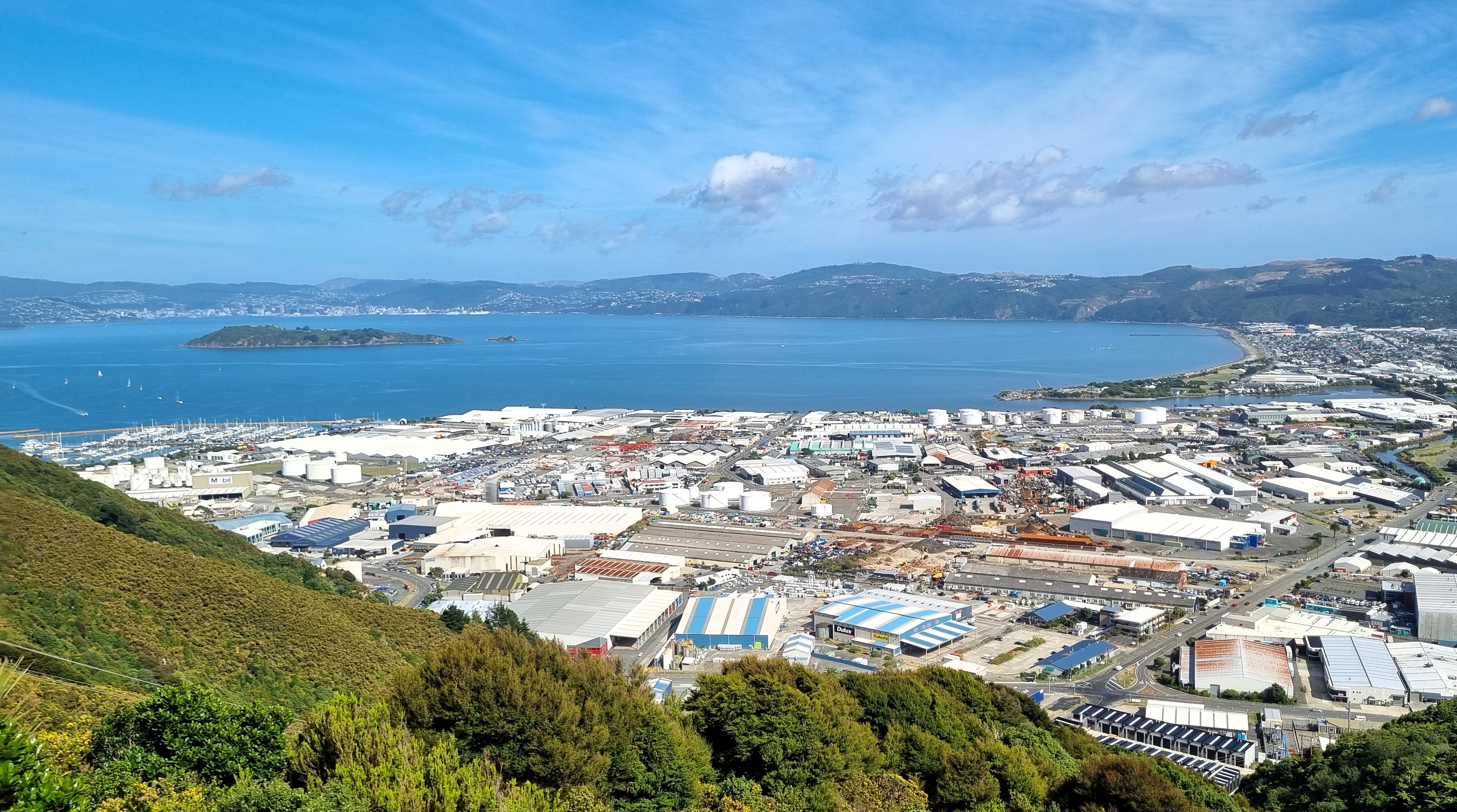
- Interactive map of Seaview
- Country: New Zealand
- City: Lower Hutt
- Local authority: Hutt City Council
- Electoral ward: Harbour

Area
  - Land: 111 ha (270 acres)

Population (2023 census)
  - Total: 36
  - Density: 32/km^{2} (84/sq mi)

Petone	Moera	Gracefield
	Seaview
Eastbourne	Sorrento Bay

Seaview is an industrial suburb of the city of Lower Hutt, in Wellington, New Zealand. Situated on the eastern coast of the Hutt Valley, the suburb lies between Te Awa Kairangi / the Hutt River and Petone (to the west), and the bays of Eastbourne to the south. Seaview is a centre for bulk liquid fuel storage for the lower half of the North Island, and a site for heavy industry. It is also a base for support services for trucks and transportation businesses and the location of the wastewater treatment plant for drainage from the Hutt Valley. Seaview is home to the Port Road Drags, the longest-running street drag races in Australasia.

== History ==
=== Māori settlement ===
In the first half of the nineteenth century there were two pā at Seaview. Ngāti Ira people lived at a pā called Ohiti or Owhiti which was later taken over by Te Āti Awa. It was situated where the Ford factory would later be built. Te Āti Awa had another settlement, Waiwhetū Pā, which was on a sandy, windswept spit at the eastern side of the mouth of the Waiwhetu Stream where it joined the Hutt River. The Waiwhetū Stream was navigable well into the Hutt Valley, providing food and ease of movement for the people at the pā. The population decreased in the 1840s after a local chief was murdered by Māori from the Wairarapa, and by 1850 only 48 people lived at Waiwhetū Pā. European settlers arrived after 1840 and by 1848 there were several ship-building yards on the Waiwhetū Stream. Māori operated a ferry service by canoe across the Waiwhetū Stream in the 1840s.

The 1855 Wairarapa earthquake changed the river into the low-lying stream it is today and turned the area a desolate strip of swampland. The local shipyards were destroyed, and Pākehā settlers focused their efforts on Petone instead. A government report in 1861 stated that only 20 Māori then lived in the Waiwhetū area: 10 Ngati-te-umo-Rangi led by Te Wiremu Uenukutara, and 10 Hamua led by Ropiha Moturoa. Today a Māori cemetery, Owhiti Urupā, remains on the site of the former Waiwhetū Pā.

=== Industrial development ===
Seaview remained undeveloped until 1929, when Lower Hutt Borough Council reclaimed land and constructed Seaview Road to provide a more direct route to the eastern bays and access to a new heavy industrial zone to be developed in the area. A drainage and sewage scheme was put in place and plans were made for bridges and more reclamation. Meanwhile, the Texas Company (now Caltex) built a fuel processing plant in 1929, fronting the new Seaview Road that was still under construction. Companies making pipes and other products were soon established nearby. Between 1936 and 1939, an additional 94 acres of land was reclaimed from swamp and estuary at the mouth of the Hutt River, and more manufacturing industries started moving into the area. Ford opened a car-assembly factory on Seaview Road in 1936, and British Australian Lead Manufacturers (now Dulux) established a paint manufacturing plant in 1937. These were followed by more companies making industrial goods such as bolts, rivets and chemicals, both in Seaview and the adjacent suburb of Gracefield.

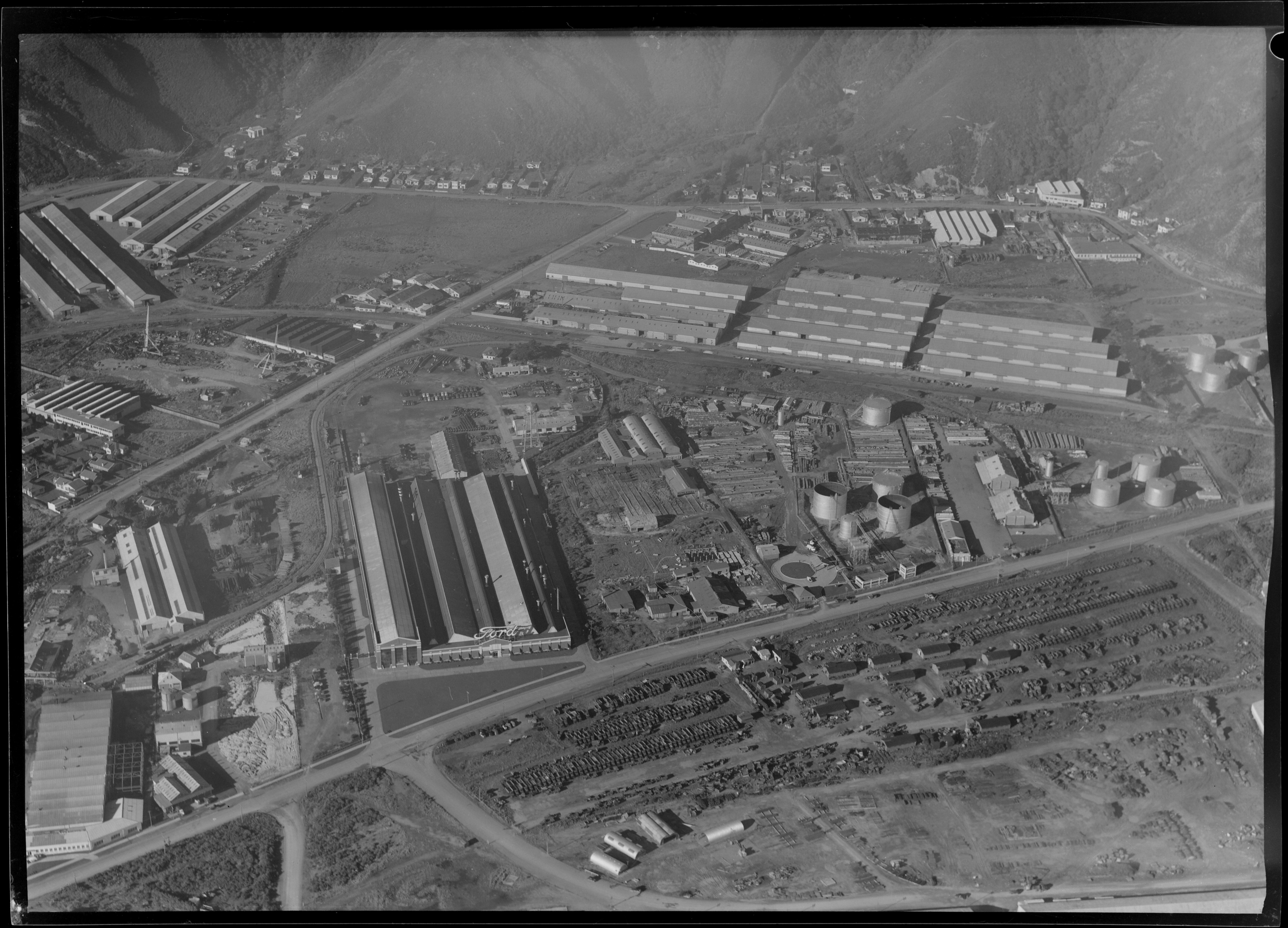
1949: The Ford factory in Seaview Road, and a dump for used US WW2 vehicles.

During World War 2, the United states arranged for car-assembly plants in Petone and Seaview (Ford) to become repair shops for US forces vehicles damaged during the war in the Pacific. Vehicles were stripped down and, where possible, reconditioned and sent back to active duty. At the end of the war the United States declared that the 2287 vehicles still stored in Seaview were surplus to their requirements. The vehicles were stacked bumper-to-bumper, with jeeps on top of truck beds, in a yard opposite the Ford factory. The New Zealand government agreed to buy the vehicles and spare parts from the United States, with a view to on-selling them to New Zealand car assemblers, but the car assemblers were not interested because of the state of the vehicles, the difficulty of getting spare parts and their specialised military nature. G.T. Gillies bought over 1200 of the vehicles and the 18 acres they were stored on in Seaview Road, and spent over 10 years fixing or disposing of them.

The Hutt Estuary Bridge was built across the Hutt River in 1954 to replace a 1912 bridge, improving the connection between Seaview and Petone. More land was reclaimed from 1955. As of 2024, Seaview is a centre for bulk liquid fuel storage and heavy industry, and is also a base for support services for trucks and transportation businesses.

=== Ford Motor Company workshop ===
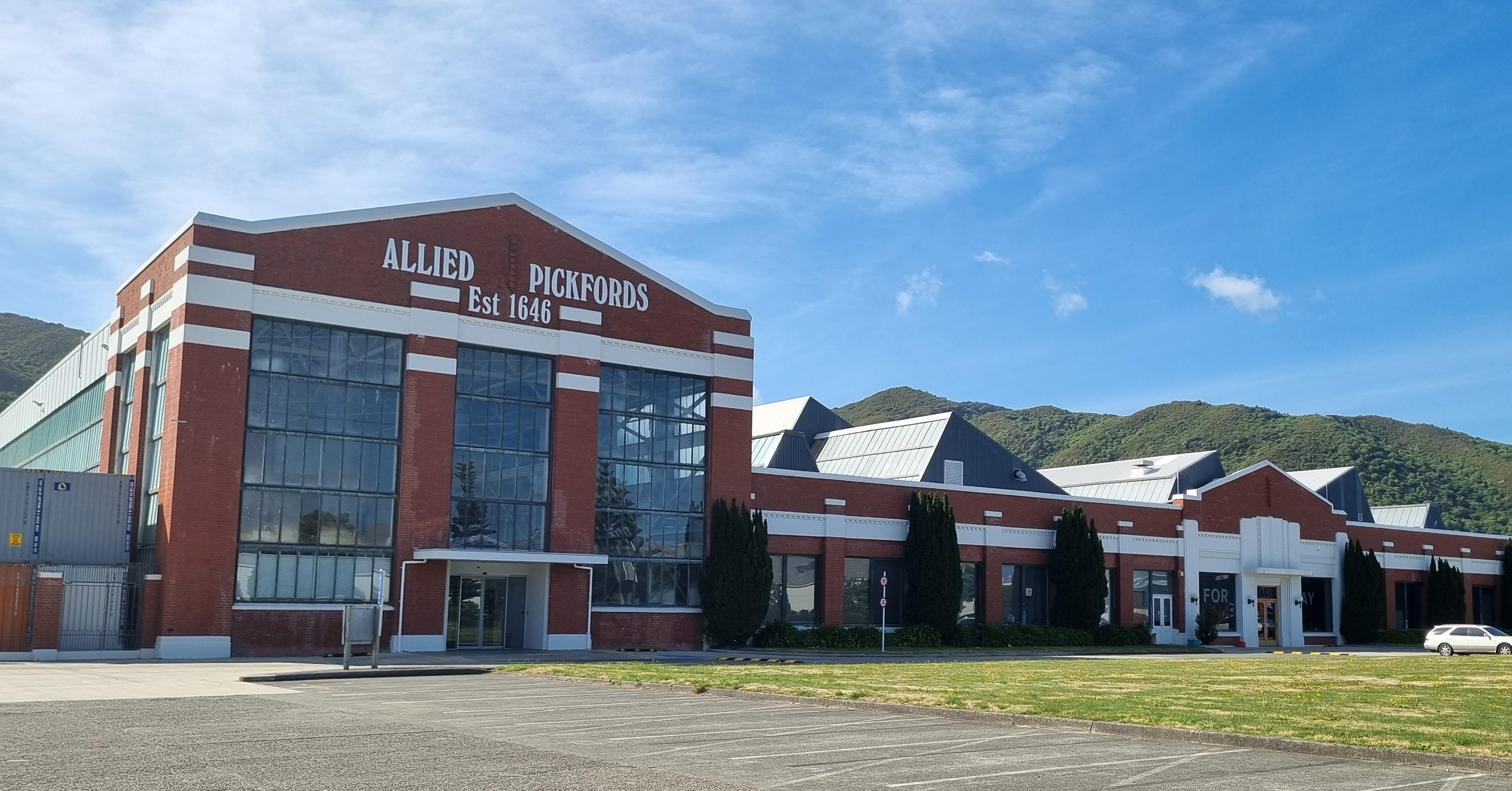
Former Ford factory in Seaview Road

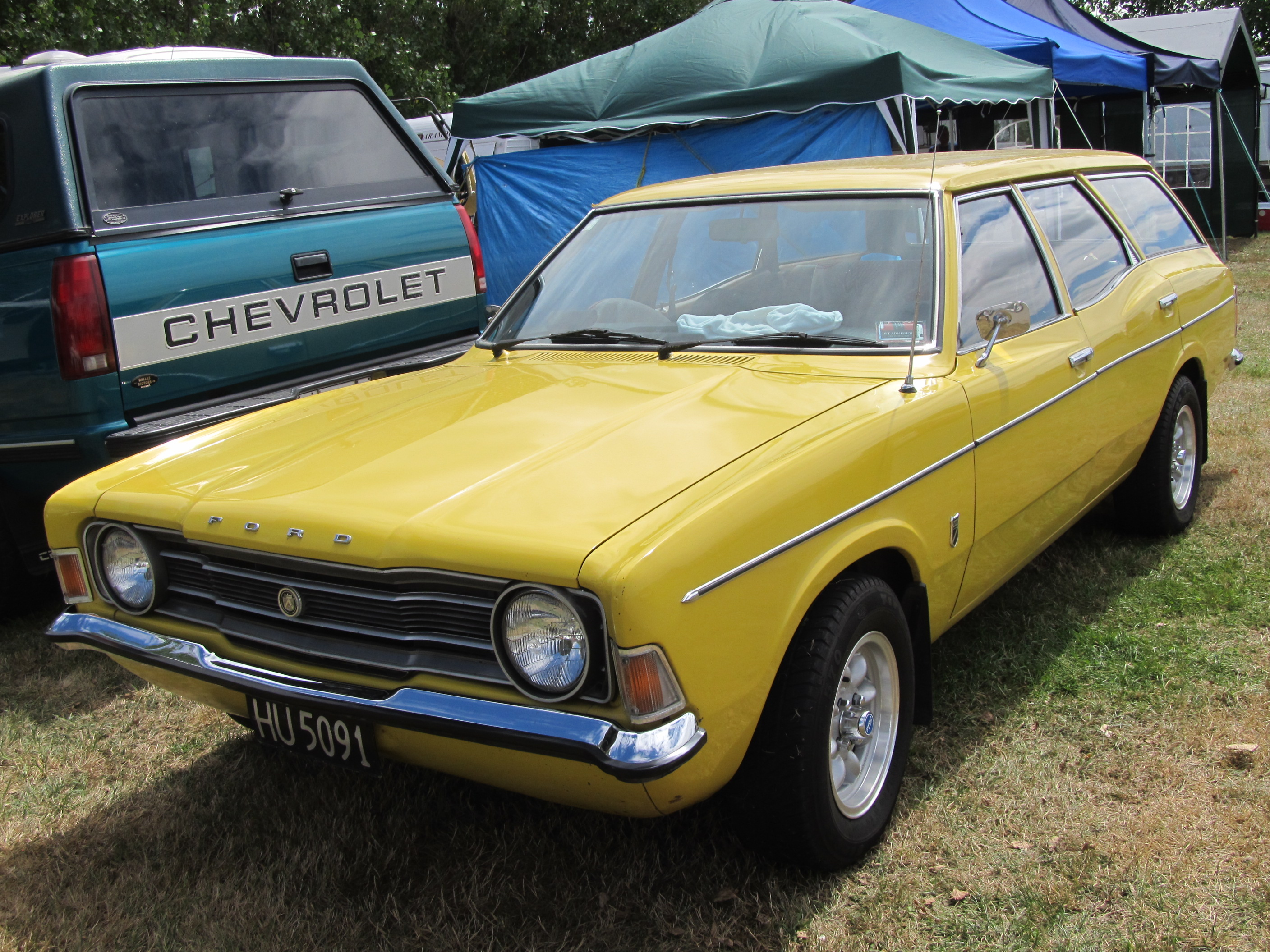
1975 Ford Cortina Estate produced at the Ford factory

In 1936, the Ford Motor Company built a large, modern vehicle assembly plant on a 13-acre site in Seaview Road. Imported car parts were welded together, finished, upholstery was made and fitted and the whole vehicle assembled in the 3.5-acre building. By the time of its official opening on 7 April 1937, the factory employed between 600 and 700 men who were producing 40 vehicles per day. Another 40 men and women worked in the company's offices. The building was designed by architects Dawson and King for efficiency and the comfort of employees. It is constructed of brick with steel framing, with large windows and skylights for maximum natural light. The largest neon sign in the southern hemisphere was mounted on the roof, facing Seaview Road and out over the harbour. It was said to be visible from Wellington city.

Over the years the factory produced various models of car including the Prefect, Anglia, Cortina, Zephyr and Zodiac, and Fordson tractors. During World War 2, arms, explosives and jeeps were produced at the factory.

In 1988 the factory closed when production shifted to Auckland. Ford employed about 700 staff at the time the closure was announced in February 1986, but as the plant wound down the number of employees dropped, and by the time of the final closure in 1988 there were about 300 employees. Many car assembly firms and other manufacturing businesses in the region had closed in the 1970s and 1980s: for example, in Petone, New Zealand Motor Bodies (closed 1978), Austin Motors (1983), and General Motors (1984). In the context of the declining manufacturing sector, closure of the Ford plant was seen as a significant event for the regional economy, for businesses supplying the plant, and for the well-being and financial situations of the workers.

Other companies later operated from the building, and in 2016 it was refurbished and earthquake-strengthened. The building was listed by Heritage New Zealand as a 'Historic Place Category 2' in 1984.

== Demographics ==
Seaview covers 1.11 km^{2} (0.43 sq mi). Very few people live in Seaview, as it is zoned for heavy industry. Seaview is included in the Gracefield statistical area.

Historical population
Year	Pop.	±% p.a.
2006	12	—
2013	15	+3.24%
2018	78	+39.06%
2023	36	−14.33%

Seaview had a population of 36 in the 2023 New Zealand census, a decrease of 42 people (−53.8%) since the 2018 census, and an increase of 21 people (140.0%) since the 2013 census. There were 24 males and 15 females in 18 dwellings. 8.3% of people identified as LGBTIQ+. The median age was 41.3 years (compared with 38.1 years nationally). There were 6 people (16.7%) aged under 15 years, 3 (8.3%) aged 15 to 29, 21 (58.3%) aged 30 to 64, and 6 (16.7%) aged 65 or older.

People could identify as more than one ethnicity. The results were 75.0% European (Pākehā); 16.7% Māori; 8.3% Pasifika; and 25.0% Middle Eastern, Latin American and African New Zealanders (MELAA). English was spoken by 100.0%, Māori by 8.3%, and other languages by 25.0%. The percentage of people born overseas was 25.0, compared with 28.8% nationally.

Religious affiliations were 16.7% Christian, and 8.3% New Age. People who answered that they had no religion were 66.7%, and 16.7% of people did not answer the census question.

Of those at least 15 years old, 9 (30.0%) people had a bachelor's or higher degree, 15 (50.0%) had a post-high school certificate or diploma, and 9 (30.0%) people exclusively held high school qualifications. The median income was $48,100, compared with $41,500 nationally. The employment status of those at least 15 was 21 (70.0%) full-time and 3 (10.0%) part-time.

== Port Road Drags ==
Port Road Drags, which is held in Port Road in Seaview, is the longest-running street drag racing event in Australasia. The first event was organised by the Hutt Valley Motoring Club in March 1966. The Wellington Hot Rod Club formed later that year, and the races have taken place along Port Road in November each year since then. Much of Port Road is closed off for the event, and classic cars fill Wellington on their way to Seaview on the day. Drag enthusiasts travel from all over the country for the races. In 2020, the event was called off early when a spectator was seriously injured.

== Seaview marina ==
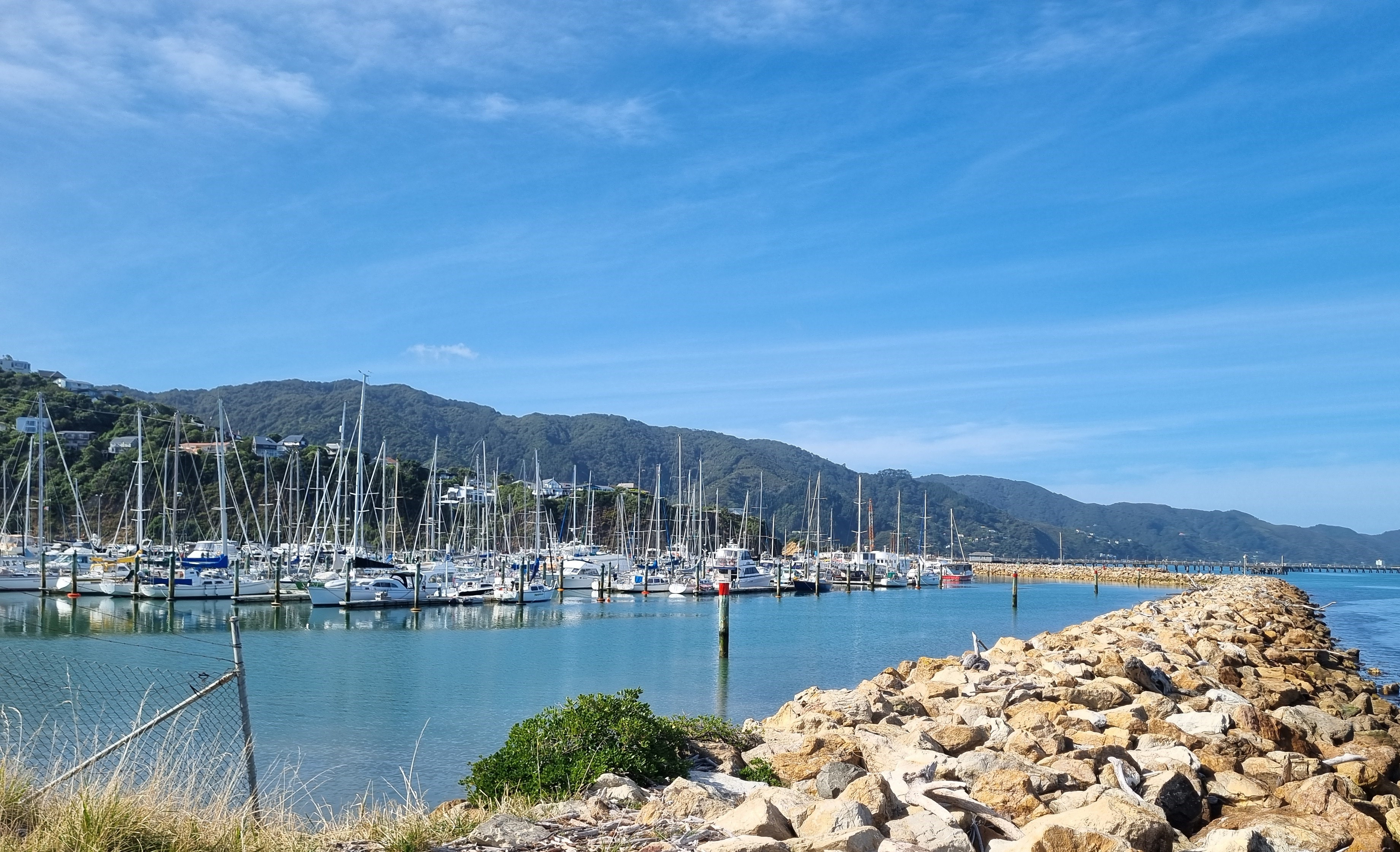
Seaview marina and breakwater.

Seaview marina is situated at the southern end of Seaview. It was built by Works Civil Construction in two stages in 1989 and 1991. The first stage involved building two breakwaters, a boat ramp and floating jetties, and in the second stage the seabed was dredged and the spoil used to reclaim land. The marina is owned by Hutt City Council. Lowry Bay Yacht Club is based at the marina, which has 360 berths for vessels of up to 26 m long and storage for 250 trailer boats.

== Seaview wharf ==
Seaview wharf is a marine fuel terminal at the north-east of Wellington Harbour. The fuel terminal is the main point of supply for liquid fuels for the lower North Island, and is also a backup point of supply for other parts of the North Island. The wharf was originally built around 1975, and is now owned by CentrePort Wellington. The landward end of the wharf is at Point Howard and it is approximately 600 metres (2,000 ft) long. Fuel pipelines along the wharf connect with bulk fuel storage facilities in Seaview. The fuel terminal handles approximately one million tonnes of fuel annually.

The wharf was damaged in the 2016 Kaikōura earthquake, but was able to continue operating. In 2021 a $60m project was commenced to improve the seismic resilience of the wharf.

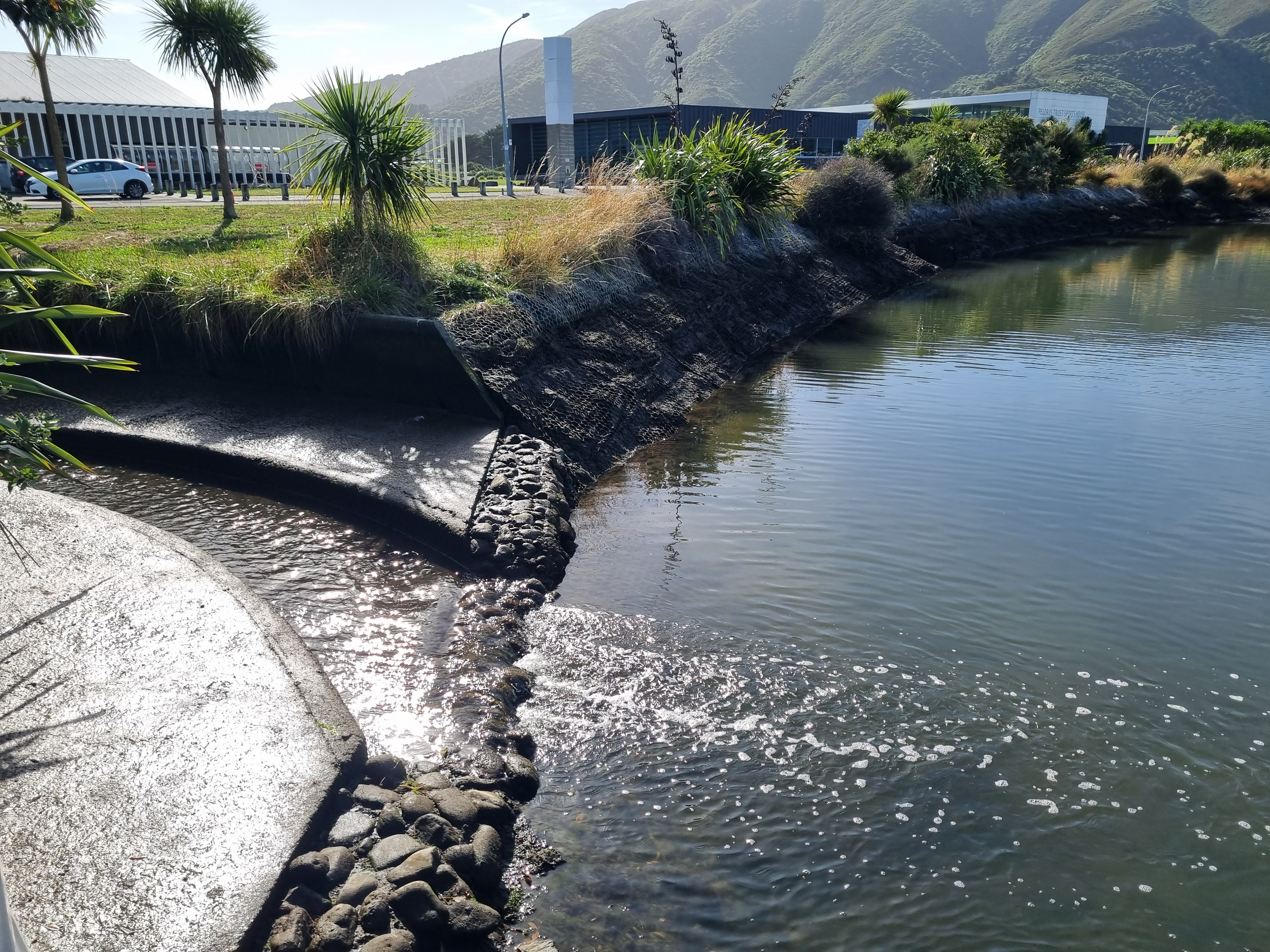
Awamutu Stream joins the Waiwhetū Stream at Seaview.

== Waiwhetū Stream ==
The lower reaches of Waiwhetū Stream pass through Seaview, and for decades it was used as an industrial sewer. In 1972, the stream caught fire because of the quantity of solvents that were being discharged. In 2001, despite 20 years having passed since the stopping of trade waste discharges from industries in the area, the river was still highly polluted with toxic sediments. Mud in the stream bed down to a depth of 1.5 metres (4 ft 11 in) was heavily contaminated with lead, zinc, DDT and hydrocarbons including diesel, oil and petrol. In 2003, it was estimated that there was 30,000 cubic metres (1,100,000 cu ft) of heavily contaminated sediment in a short section of the stream between Seaview Road and the rail bridge just north of Hutt Park Holiday Village. Local groups urged that a clean-up be undertaken. A major clean-up project commenced in 2009 to remove 12,000 cubic metres (420,000 cu ft) of contaminated mud from the lower reaches of the stream. The work was funded by Hutt City Council, Greater Wellington Regional Council and the Ministry for the Environment, and cost over $20 million. At the time, the stream was described as one of the country's most polluted waterways. The clean-up was declared complete in June 2010, after the removal of 56,000 tonnes of toxic waste.

== Wastewater treatment plant and outfall ==
Prior to 2001, wastewater from the entire Hutt Valley was screened and then pumped without any further treatment via a pipeline along the eastern coastline of Wellington Harbour to an ocean outfall near the harbour entrance at Pencarrow Head. By the 1990s, the discharge of untreated sewage into the ocean had become environmentally unacceptable. Planning for a new sewage treatment plan began in the mid 1990s. In 1998, tenders were called for a design, build and operate contract for a treatment plant to be built in Seaview that would provide secondary treatment of all sewage from the Hutt Valley and Wainuiomata. It was to be located close to the Waiwhetū Stream. A contract was let in 1999, and the plant was commissioned in 2001.

In March 2022, Wellington Water reported a leak in the pipeline to the outfall, in the Seaview area. Repairs required the shutdown of the pipeline, and the discharge of fully treated wastewater into Waiwhetū Stream while the repairs were carried out. In September 2023, Wellington Water predicted that pipeline shutdowns for repairs will become increasingly frequent, possibly rising to 30 times per year, with a typical repair time of 1 week, leading to repeated discharges of treated wastewater into the Waiwhetū Stream. Options presented to the Hutt City and Upper Hutt councils included refurbishment of the existing pipeline, or the construction of a new pipeline in Wellington Harbour. The forecast costs of a new outfall pipeline were approximately $700 million, with a further $300 million required for upgrades to the Seaview treatment plant, including a replacement sludge drier.

== Gallery ==
Views of Seaview

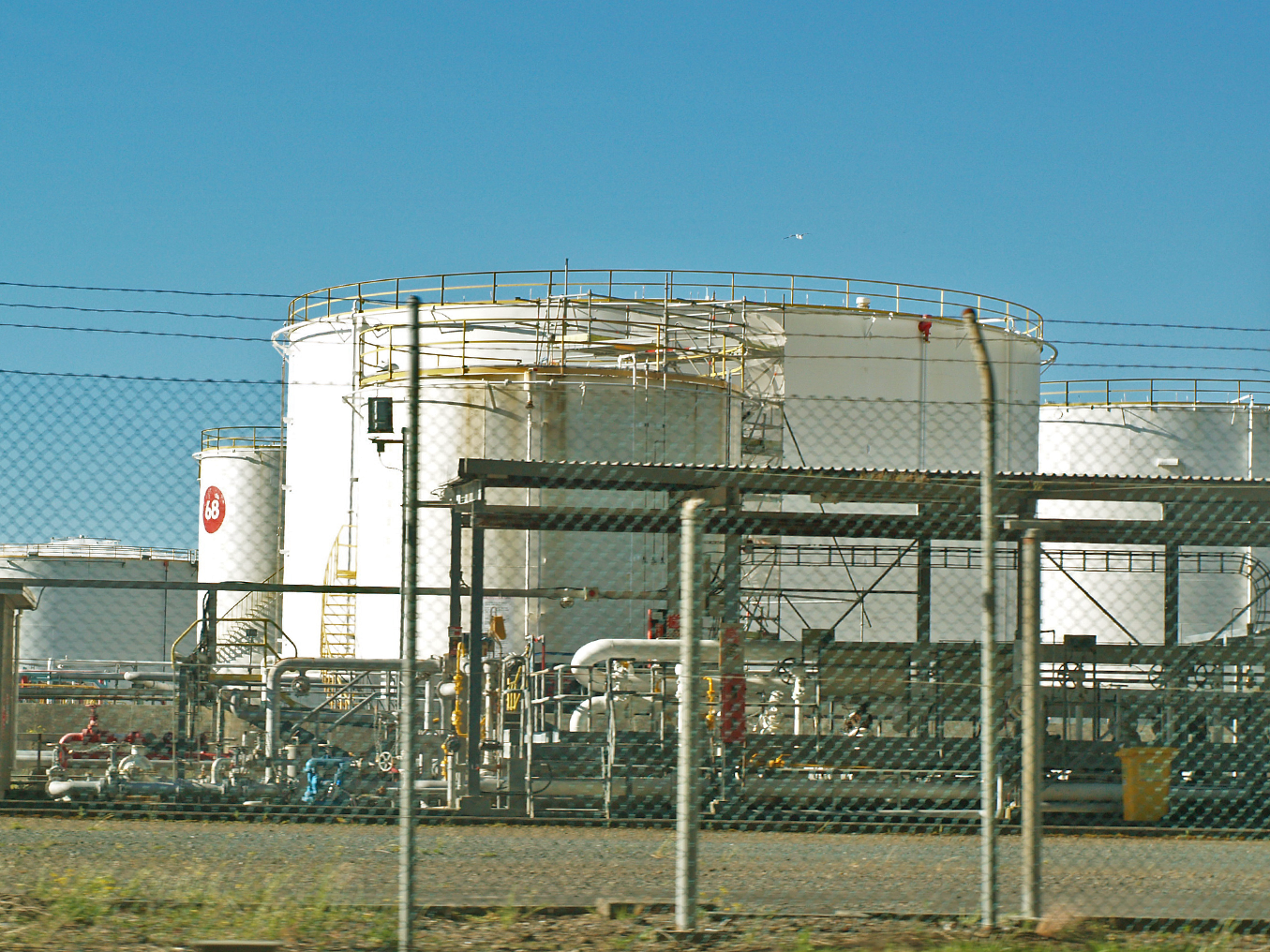
Oil Tanks in Seaview, November 2020.

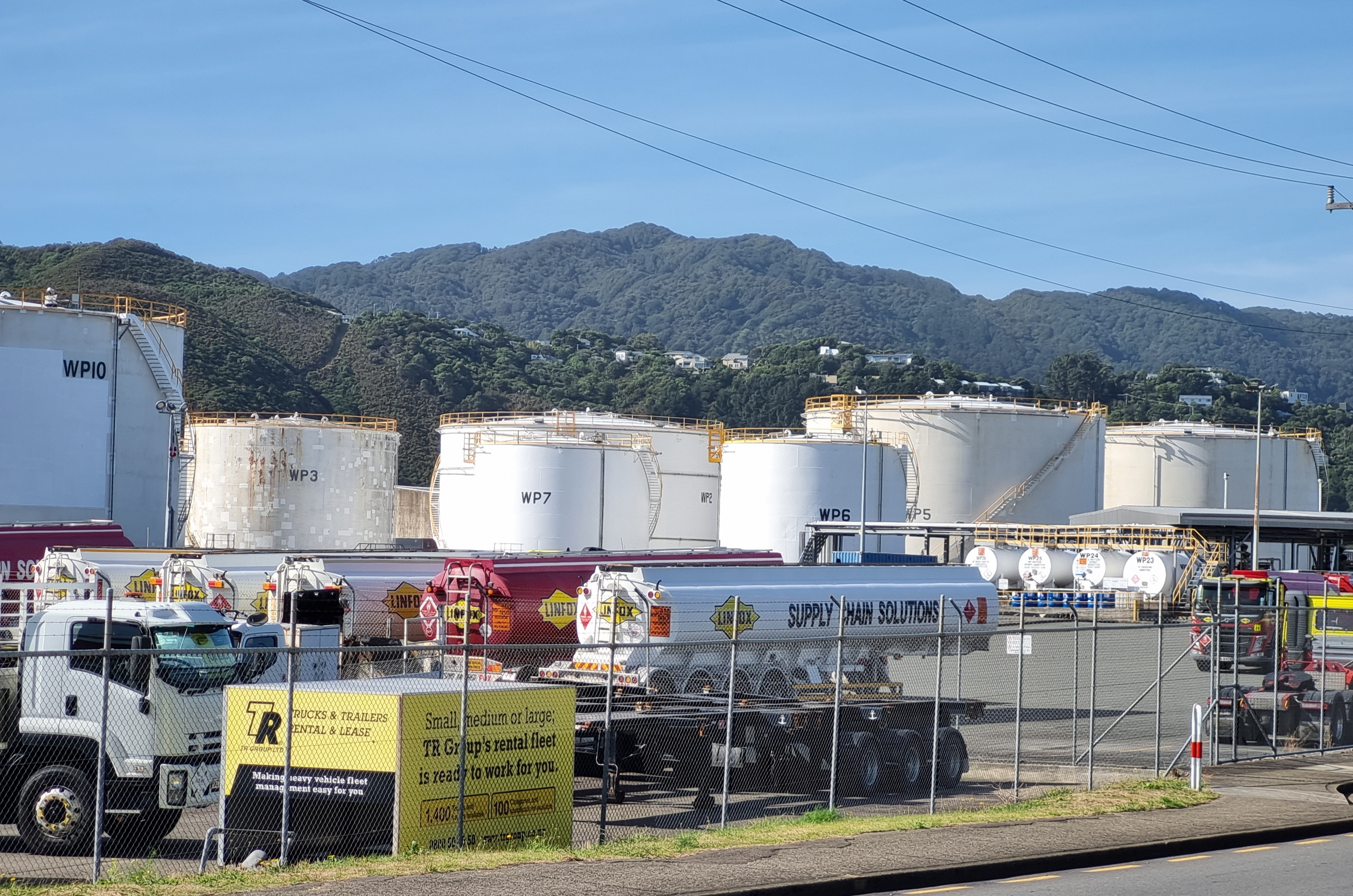
Fuel tanks at Port Road, Seaview.

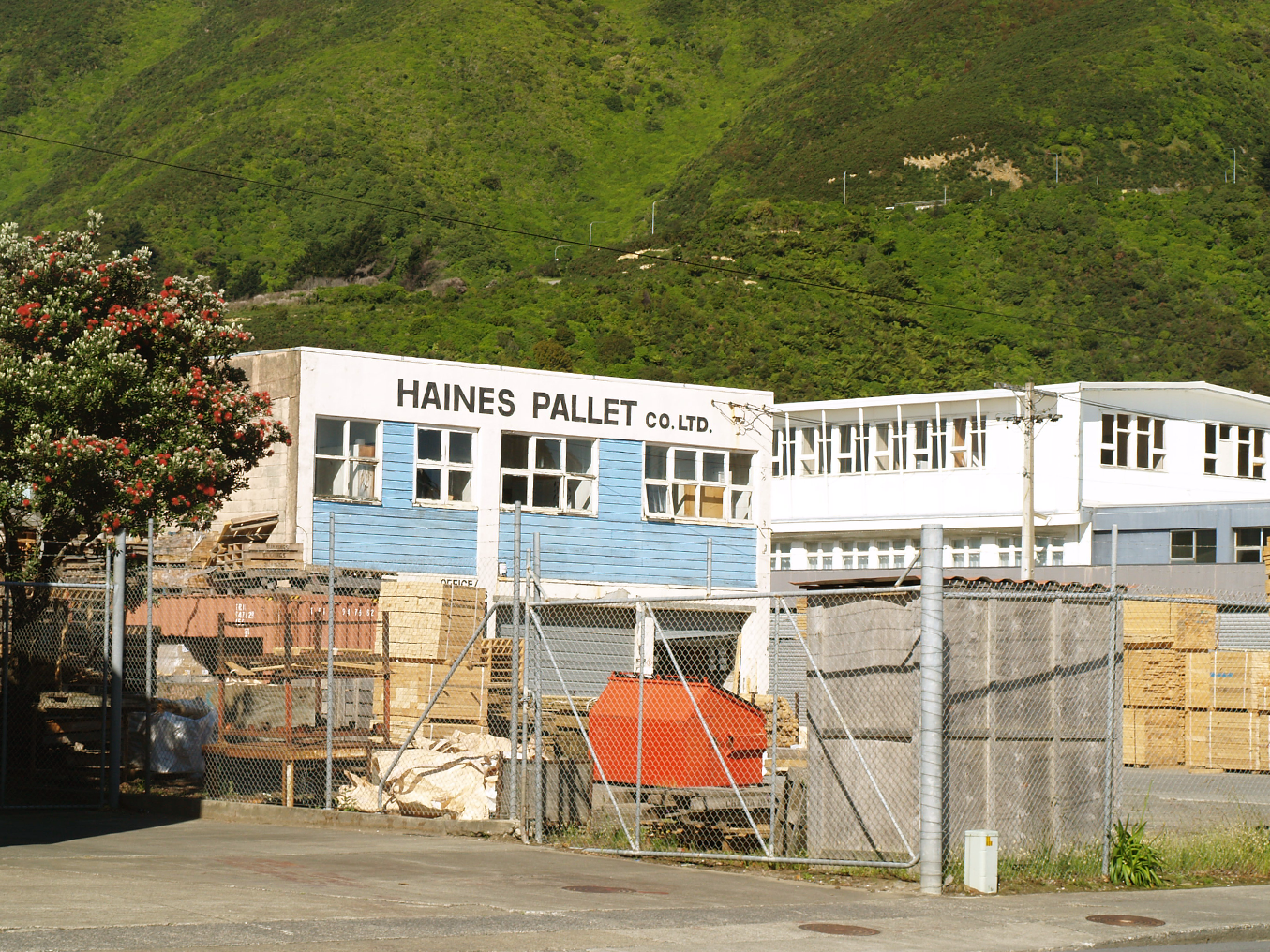
Old industrial buildings. Wainuiomata Hill Road in background.

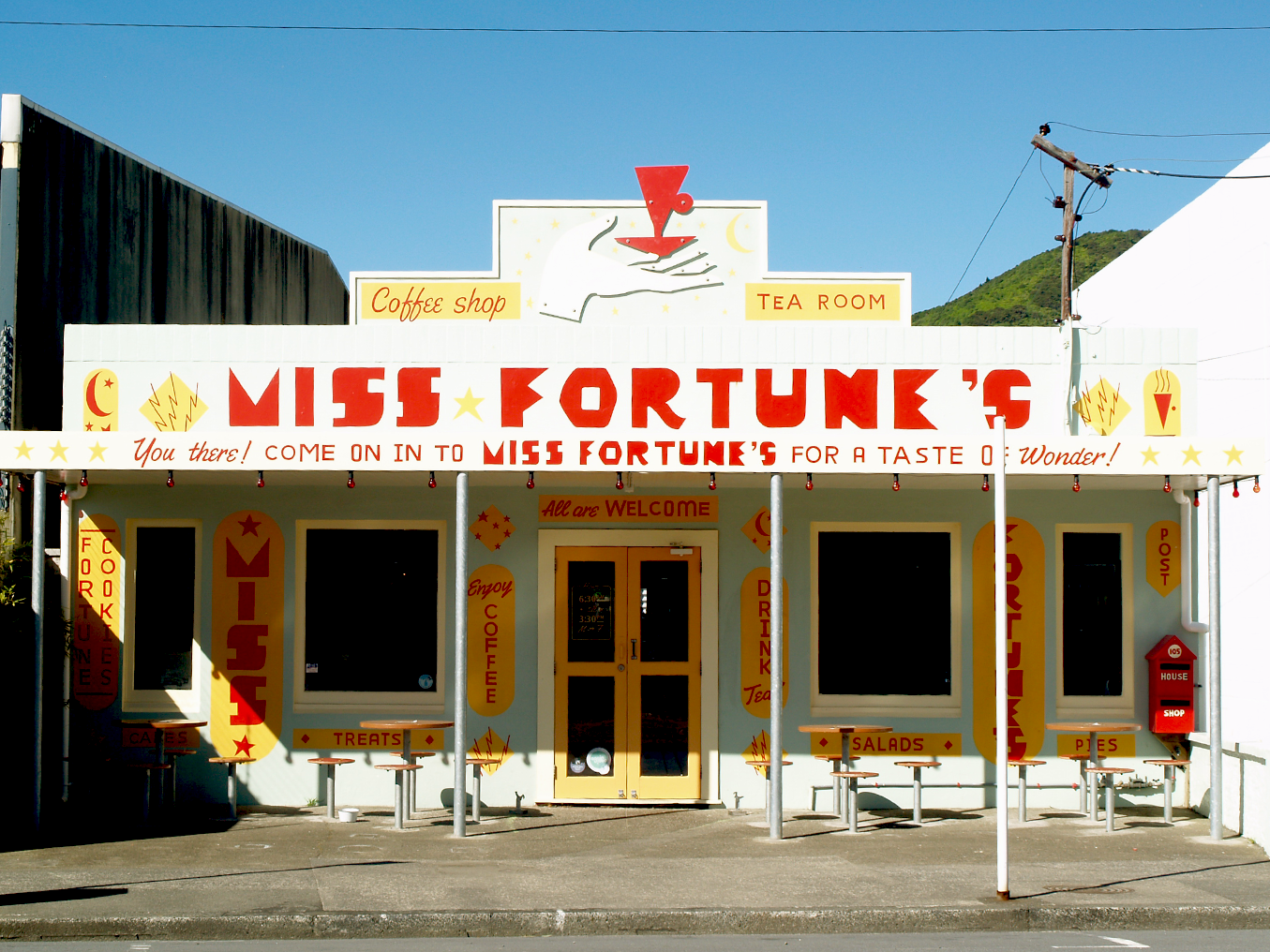
Miss Fortune's café, 2020.
