= Hutt Park Railway =

Private railway in New Zealand

Overview
- Locale: Hutt Valley, New Zealand

History
- Opened: 1885
- Closed: 1982

Technical
- Track gauge: 1,067 mm (3 ft 6 in)

The Hutt Park Railway was a private railway in Petone at the southern end of the Hutt Valley in New Zealand's North Island. It operated from 1885 as a branch from the Hutt Valley section of the Wairarapa Line, from 1915 truncated as an industrial siding.

== Construction ==
The Hutt Park Railway was constructed to serve the Hutt Park Raceway horse racing track of the Wellington Racing Club (WRC). The WRC was in competition with the Wellington Jockey Club's track in Island Bay and sought the competitive advantage of a railway to provide easier access for patrons. The first proposals for a line were made as early as 1874, not long after the first portion of the Wairarapa Line was opened to Lower Hutt, but this proposal was rejected by the 1880 Royal Commission. Nonetheless, in 1884 the Hutt Park Railway Company was formed and the 3.2-kilometre line was constructed in 38 days. Construction took place without authorisation; to resolve a legal dispute in the High Court, section 137 of the Reserves and Other Lands Disposal and Public Bodies Empowering Act 1915 legitimised the line.

== Operation ==
The junction with the main line was at a flag station known as Beach, and the line terminated at Hutt Park, a 122-metre long platform by the western bank of the Hutt River. In the 1901 Working Timetable these two stops are called Petone Junction and Racecourse Platform respectively. Trains ran whenever there was a race meeting, approximately four times a year for one or two days, from Te Aro at the end of the Te Aro Extension via Lambton Railway Station, a predecessor of Wellington railway station. They were run by the New Zealand Railways Department on behalf of the Hutt Park Railway Company and typically employed a W^{A} class tank locomotive as motive power.

== Closure ==
In 1906 the WRC relocated to a new track near Trentham Railway Station and the Hutt Park Railway fell into disuse. The company went into liquidation in 1918. The railway from Victoria Street to the Hutt River was lifted, while the remaining portion passed into the possession of the Gear Meat Preserving and Freezing Company as an industrial siding. Gear owned its own small locomotives to perform shunting duties. Two have been saved for preservation: former Railways Department D 137 and a Barclay 4-4-0. In November 1963 they were sold to another company and subsequently passed into the possession of the Silver Stream Railway. In 1982 Gear ceased operations and the last remnants of the Hutt Park Railway were removed. Some of the track and sleepers were used at the Silver Stream Railway.
