= History of Canterbury Region =

Aspect of New Zealand history

The history of the Canterbury Region of the South Island of New Zealand dates back to settlement by Māori people in about the 14th century.

== Pre-1840 Māori period ==
Probably no more than 500 Māori were living in Canterbury by the time European settlement began in the 1840s. They were members of the Ngāi Tahu tribe, which occupied much of the South Island, remnants of a population that may have numbered between 3,000 and 4,000 people at the beginning of the 19th century. Decimated by civil war from 1810 to 1815, they were almost exterminated between 1830 and 1832 in attacks by the northern Ngāti Toa, led by Te Rauparaha.

=== Early Moa-hunters ===
The earliest settlers of Canterbury appear to have been the people called the Moa-hunters, arriving in about the 14th century near the time of the traditional discovery of the South Island by Rākaihautū. Traces of the presence of these people are found in camp and burial sites near river mouths, the northern valleys of Banks Peninsula and on Hikuraki Bay. The burial sites of the Moa-hunters containing moa eggs, ornamental artifacts and whale tooth pendants show that their culture differed from that of the later Māori.

South Island tradition however gives no account of the Moa-hunters. There is the legend of a shadowy aboriginal people known as "Te Kahui Tipua", or 'the band of ogres', who were destroyed by later arrivals called Te Rapuwai.

=== Archaic Māori period ===
In the time of Te Rapuwai, the forests of Canterbury were said to have been burned and the moa exterminated. (Note: The same story about the burning of the forests is related in several parts of New Zealand to account for the disappearance of the moa. R.S. Duff, in the Moa Hunter Period of Maori Culture, places the end of the moa-hunter period somewhat later than this, at about the year 1500.) The Waitaha followed them, occupying the eastern districts of the South Island. These appear to have been a numerous people, with a large pā near Mairangi and Kapukariki and other settlements on the banks of the Rakaia River. One of them, Te Hau, is credited with having destroyed a large bird of prey that nested on one of the large spurs of the Torlesse Range. The reference to this bird is interpreted as being a composite memory of the extinct New Zealand swan and the extinct Haast's eagle (Hieraeetus moorei), which were contemporaries of the moa.

In North Canterbury and Banks Peninsula, the Waitaha found an abundance of food. On the plains and foothills the finest sort of flax root and cabbage trees grew, and kiore (rats) and weka swarmed in the open country. The woods were full of kākā, pigeons and other birds suitable for food. Lakes were covered with water fowl and teemed with eels, silveries and whitebait, and along the coast was an abundance of fish as well as birds of every sort.

=== Classical Māori period ===
Abundance of food, however, eventually proved to be the undoing of the Waitaha, for it attracted other invaders to dispute their possession. About the year 1500 they were destroyed or absorbed by invaders from the East Coast of the North Island, the Ngāti Mamoe tribe. Within 125 years, they occupied the whole east coast of the South Island, including Otago and Southland, where they drove the Waitaha into the back country of the lake district.

After holding the land for four or five generations the Ngāti Mamoe in their turn were attacked and finally subjugated by another wave of invaders from the north. These were the Ngāi Tahu, who, although originally settling in the Poverty Bay district on their arrival in canoes, had subsequently moved southwards.

In 1627, the Ngāi Tahu had their chief settlement on the shores of Wellington harbour at Hataitai, but began to move over the northern parts of the South Island, which was then the territory of the Ngāti Mamoe. Although there was some small-scale fighting at times, in the first years of the migration, the Ngāi Tahu lived at peace with the Ngāti Mamoe of the Wairau district and intermarried freely with them. Inter-tribal jealousies led in the end, however, to a major battle at Pakihi, just north of the Conway River, in which the Ngāti Mamoe were routed.

Thereafter the Ngāi Tahu moved steadily southwards in a campaign of conquest, until after a little more than a generation they had subjugated the Ngāti Mamoe in most of the country of the east coast, as far south as Lake Waihola, south of the Otago peninsula. During this period, when many of the Ngāti Mamoe were a hunted people, some groups of them lived in the caves of the river gorges, as at Weka Pass, Opihi Gorge, and the Upper Waitaki. Drawings on the walls of these 'rock shelters' suggest their occupation. Nevertheless, there appears to have been considerable intermingling of the two tribes so that in later years, the Ngāti Mamoe lost their identity as a separate people.

Ngāi Tahu were led in the later stages of their campaigns against the Ngāti Mamoe by the sons of the chief Tu Rakautahi. It was he who in the early years of the 18th century fixed the headquarters of the tribe at Kaiapoi Pā (near present-day Kaiapoi), choosing the site mainly for its good defensive position on a promontory of dry land almost entirely surrounded by swamps. There he built a pā that became famous throughout the South Island for its strength and size, and the wealth of its people. The timber for the construction of the pa came from the forests from Woodend to Rangiora. "The fortifications consisted of earthworks surrounded by strong palisades. The defences on the land side were strengthened by a broad ditch which extended across the entire front of the pa. Behind the wall of earth was a double row of strong palisades.". The posts of this palisade were as thick as the mainmast of a ship.

Under Tu Rakautahi, the Māori of North Canterbury developed a system of food gathering and barter necessitated by the fact that they could not survive upon the produce of their local cultivations. Abundant food was obtainable in their territory, but much had to be sought much further afield and brought to the centre – at one season from Te Waihora, at others from the Torlesse range, from the lakes of the interior, from Banks Peninsula, or from the open plains. In some of these out-districts the people occupied partly fortified pas, in others they lived on open kainga of a few huts without fortification, and in still others they had no more than camping shelters. But their base was Kaiapoi, which, with a population of at least 1000 people, was a considerable Māori town, and the permanent home of the most important chiefly families of the Ngāi Tahu. These people were in constant communication with their still numerous kinsmen in the north at Kaikōura (which had an even larger population than Kaiapoi) and also with the large body of the Ngāi Tahu who had gone further south to settle in Otakou.

With these more distant districts there developed a system of interchange of gifts of food, which was really a form of trading. From the far south came preserved muttonbirds and dried fish, the canoes or carriers returning from Kaiapoi with loads of kūmara; while to Kaikōura went part of the store of southern muttonbirds in exchange for potted pigeons. A survival of this traffic was seen by Europeans as late as 1844.

Kaiapoi was known to the Māori of other parts of New Zealand as the home of a people who had both an abundance of food, and an exceptional wealth of the highly prized pounamu. In the eyes of the Māori, this hard and tenacious nephrite jade was the nearest equivalent to metal itself, and a tool or weapon made of it was considered a prized possession. Ownership of greenstone was a mania of the Māori, driving them to endure unimaginable hardships to obtain it. The main greenstone source was in the Taramakau and Arahura Rivers on the West Coast, roughly opposite Kaiapoi.

Until the Ngāti Wairangi of the West Coast were conquered about the year 1800, the expeditions sent across the ranges by Ngāi Tahu were war-parties, equipped to fight for the greenstone they wanted. The Ngāi Tahu used eight routes across the ranges, those from Canterbury and its immediate northern district being up the Rakaia River and over the Whitcombe or Browning passes to the Hokitika river; up the Waimakariri River and over Arthur's Pass to the Taramakau; up the Waipara and the Hurunui Rivers by Lake Sumner to Harper pass and the Taramakau; and (from Kaikōura) up the Waiau-uha and thence by either the Amuri pass to the Ahaura River and on to the Grey River, or by the Lewis Saddle down the Cannibal Gorge directly to the Grey River.

=== Kai Huānga feud ===
Even within the Ngāi Tahu tribe there were feuds and rivalries that led to bloodshed, and even open warfare. The most important of these outbreaks – a bloody feud that developed into civil war – began between 1810 and 1815, about the time of the first contacts of European flax-traders with the Māori of Banks Peninsula. This was known as the Kai Huānga or 'eating of relations' feud, which, by destroying the Ngāi Tahu in Canterbury, effectively prepared the way for their conquest in 1832 by Te Rauparaha.

The leading character in this feud was Tama-i-hara-nui, principal chief of the Ngāi Tahu, who appears to have lived both at Kaiapoi pa and at Takapūneke near present-day Akaroa. Of Tama-i-hara-nui's character Stack (in his book Kaiapohia: The Story of a Siege (Note: Stack was the first to use the name "Kaiapohia" and many subsequent authors copied him. The term is incorrect and an insult to Ngāi Tahu, as it means "the piling up of bodies to eat".)) says: "Unlike most Maori chiefs of exalted rank he was cowardly, cruel and capricious." The Kai Huānga feud began when Murihake, a woman at Waikakahi on the eastern shores of Te Waihora, happened to put on a dog-skin cloak left in the village by Tama-i-hara-nui, who was then absent at Kaikōura. This sacrilegious action required that the chief, or his relations on his behalf, should immediately take utu (or payment in revenge). But instead of taking revenge on the woman herself, the chief's relations ambushed and killed a slave belonging to one of her relations. In revenge for the death of the slave, the woman's relations went to a village near Tai Tapu and killed a man named Hape, who was related to those who had killed the slave. But it also happened that Hape's wife was the sister of the principal chief of Taumutu. At this stage Tama-i-hara-nui returned from Kaikōura. Telling the people of Kaiapoi, who had ties with both sides, to stay out of the fight, he went on to Takapūneke and then to Wairewa (Little River), where he gathered a war party. From Wairewa an attack was launched on Taumutu, in which many of the people of that village were killed, including some Kaiapoi women married to men of Taumutu.

In the next stage of the feud the people of Taumutu were joined by reinforcements from Otago under the chief Taiaroa, and also, in spite of Tama-i-hara-nui's order, by about 100 men from Kaiapoi, who wished to avenge the death of the Taumutu women. This force then proceeded to attack Wairewa, led by two men with muskets – the first of these weapons to be carried by a war party in Canterbury. They found the pā empty, however, chiefly because Taiaroa, whose real purpose was to try to end the feud, had warned the people of Wairewa of the approach of the war party. On their way home, the Kaiapoi men fell upon and killed a nephew of the important chief Taununu, whose pā was at Ripapa Island. Instead of taking his reprisal by attacking Kaiapoi – probably because of the strength of that fortress – Tanunu attacked Whakaepa (Coalgate), a small but populous offshoot of Kaiapoi, and killed all its people.

Kaiapoi was now more deeply involved in the feud. A strong war party was sent to join the Taumutu people, and again with reinforcements from Otago, a new attack was launched against Wairewa. Once more Taiaroa sent warning against the defenders, but although many got away from the pā in canoes, they were followed and most of them were killed or drowned. Among those killed were two sisters of Tama-i-hara-nui. This battle ended in a cannibal feast, which was considered particularly atrocious because of the close relationship of the victors and the slain. The war party then went on to attack Purau and Ripapa Island, and although many of the occupants of these villages escaped, some going up the steep hills behind the island and rolling stones down upon their pursuers, very many, including Taununu, were killed.

The fighting then ended for a time, mainly because fear of reprisals drove the people of Taumutu to abandon their village and, together with some of their allies, to seek sanctuary in Otago under the protection of Taiaroa. How long they remained there is not clear, but subsequently Tama-i-hara-nui went down to Otago and assured them that if they went back to Taumutu they would be allowed to live in peace. Most of the exiles believed his assurances, gathered their families, and set out on the northward march. Tama-i-hara-nui's promises, however, were no more than a ruse to get them back within his reach. Gathering a large force from Kaiapoi, he waylaid them as they travelled up the coast. Although, like their attackers, some of the Taumutu warriors were armed with muskets, they were hopelessly outnumbered, and men, women, and children were slaughtered.

This was the last major event of the Kai Huānga feud. Never was a conflict in Canterbury more aptly named, or distinguished by greater confusion, for among the Ngāi Tahu of Canterbury, lines of allegiance had become so involved that strict application of the laws of vengeance, once the first few blows had been struck, gave almost every subdivision of the tribe and almost every family group a reason for attacking or distrusting its neighbours.

Even after this destruction of the people of Taumutu in the late 1820s, the feud would probably have flared up again, but within a year or two the Canterbury Ngāi Tahu found it necessary to forget internal differences and to face the threat of invasion as Te Rauparaha and his Ngāti Toa struck their first blows against Ngāi Tahu's northern kinsmen in the Kaikōura district.

=== Attacks by Ngāti Toa ===
==== Expeditions to Kaikōura and Kaiapoi ====
By 1827 Te Rauparaha, who in 1822 had led his Ngāti Toa in their remarkable emigration from Kawhia to Waikanae and Kapiti, was beginning to attack the tribes of the northern part of the South Island, his warriors being armed with muskets as well as Māori weapons. Late in 1827, or in 1828, he took a strong war party by sea to Kaikōura, seeking to avenge himself for the insult by the Ngāi Tahu chief Rerewhaka, who boasted that if Te Rauparaha came to Kaikōura he would rip up his belly with a barracouta tooth. Fortune favoured the Ngāti Toa, for the people of Kaikōura were expecting the arrival of a party of Ngāi Tahu from the south, and mistaking the invaders canoes for those of their friends, went out unarmed to welcome them. The confusion that followed gave the Ngāti Toa an easy victory. The three pā of Kaikōura Peninsula were destroyed, and it is estimated that of a total population of nearly 2000, more than half were killed and many others taken as prisoners to Kapiti. The remnants of the Kaikōura Ngāi Tahu retreated to the back country, or to pā further south along the coast. The most important of these places of refuge was Omihi Pa, north of the Oaro River.

In 1829, Te Rauparaha returned to the attack. He landed at Kaikōura, but the inhabitants had fled at his approach. He then continued down the coast and attacked and destroyed the pā at Omihi, the reason given being that the people of Omihi were sheltering the chief Kekerengu, who had taken refuge in the Kaikōura district after being discovered in an affair with one of the wives of Te Rangihaeata, Te Rauparaha's nephew and chief lieutenant. The pā was destroyed and most of its people were killed. Kekerengu escaped.

Sending most of his force back to Kapiti with prisoners, Te Rauparaha continued with about 100 men by sea to the Waipara River. He marched along the beaches to Kaiapoi and camped near the pā. (Note: This first visit of Te Rauparaha to Kaiapoi cannot be dated exactly. His son Tamihana Te Rauparaha said, in a narrative describing the conflict with Ngāi Tahu, said it happened one year before the brig Elizabeth attack on Akaroa, which took place in early November 1830.) The ostensible purpose of his visit was to trade for greenstone, but Tama-i-hara-nui, after a ceremonial visit to Te Rauparaha's camp, became suspicious and retired to his pā. A Ngā Puhi visitor to Kaiapoi, Hakitara, who as a neutral was able to remain in the camp overnight, overheard Te Rauparaha and Te Rangihaeata planning to attack Kaiapoi, and was able to warn the Kaiapoi chiefs of their visitor's treacherous intentions. He also discovered that some of the Ngāti Toa had desecrated the grave of Tama-i-hara-nui's aunt. The arrival of fugitives from Omihi confirmed the suspicions of the Kaiapoi chiefs, who decided to break the truce that had been observed during the previous day, and to strike the first blow.

Meanwhile, to keep up the appearance that his visit was solely for the purposes of trade, Te Rauparaha had allowed several of his leading chiefs to enter the fortress, where they traded muskets and ammunition for greenstone. Among them was Te Pēhi Kupe, a notable warrior and higher-born relative of Te Rauparaha, who only a few years previously in 1824 had travelled to England, mainly to obtain European weapons. An altercation began as Te Pēhi tried to take a block of greenstone that the owner wished to keep. Then Rongotara, one of the Kaiapoi chiefs, noticed that Pokitara, one of the leading Ngāti Toa, was about to enter the pā. In anger at the fact that his daughter, captured at Omihi, had been allotted to Pokitara as a slave, Rongotara killed Pokitara as he stooped to come under the gate. Then followed a general slaughter of the Ngāti Toa within the pā. Eight chiefs – including Te Pēhi Kupe – were killed. (Note: Seeking to justify to Europeans his attacks on the Ngāi Tahu, Te Rauparaha in 1830 claimed that a European named Smith, flax-buying agent from Captain Wiseman, was killed at Kaiapoi by the Ngāi Tahu at the same time as the Ngāti Toa chiefs.)

Te Rauparaha had not expected such an attack, and with a small force at his disposal he could not undertake a direct assault on so strong and populous a fortress. Had the Ngāi Tahu taken the initiative outside the pā, as they had within it, they might have readily destroyed his whole force. As it was, he retreated quickly up the coast to the Waipara River, re-embarked in his canoes, and returned to Kapiti.

==== Capture of Tama-i-hara-nui at Akaroa ====
Te Rauparaha began to plan how to take revenge on Ngāi Tahu, and particularly on Tama-i-hara-nui, who as their paramount chief was held responsible for the massacre of Te Pēhi Kupe and other Ngāti Toa chiefs at Kaiapoi. It was known that Tama-i-hara-nui at this time lived for the most part at Takapūneke, in order to be more accessible to the European flax traders who during the 1820s were fairly regular visitors to Akaroa Harbour. Accordingly, the Ngāti Toa attack must be directed at Takapūneke. Only a surprise attack could succeed, but the march of a war party across North Canterbury or the approach of a large fleet of canoes would make surprise impossible. So Te Rauparaha decided to use a European ship for his raid, knowing that the Takapūneke Māori would not suspect such a vessel of carrying a war party, and would welcome it as a trader.

His first approach was to Captain Briggs of the Hobart ship Dragon, but Briggs rejected the proposal. Te Rauparaha then offered Captain John Stewart of the brig Elizabeth, just arrived from London via Sydney, a cargo of 50 tons of flax as payment for the transportation of the war party to Akaroa. Although Briggs warned him that taking on board so large a number of Māori would give them effective control of his ship, Stewart, who was on his first voyage to New Zealand, would not be dissuaded, apparently seeing the arrangement an easy way of filling his ship with a valuable cargo.

On 29 October 1830 the chiefs Te Rauparaha and Te Hiko, with a taua of 140 men, armed with muskets as well as Māori weapons, embarked on the Elizabeth at Kapiti, and sailed for Banks Peninsula. On arrival at Takapūneke the Elizabeth anchored in the bay off the Ngāi Tahu village. To prevent discovery of the real purpose of the ship's visit, Te Rauparaha's party remained below decks, and messages were sent to Tama-i-hara-nui, who was away at the flax grounds at Wairewa, that the captain wished to trade muskets for flax. A few days after their arrival the captain and Cowell, the trading master, went ashore to shoot pigeons. As their boat was returning to the ship they met a canoe in which were Tama-i-hara-nui, his 11-year-old daughter, and three or four other Māori. The aged chief and his daughter were taken in the captain's boat to the ship. In the ship's cabin Tama-i-hara-nui was put in irons and confronted by his enemies.

During the day other canoes came out to the ship, their occupants being invited on board, and then captured and placed below decks. Among those taken in this way was Tama-i-hara-nui's wife. None escaped to give warning, and as it was customary for parties visiting European vessels to remain a considerable time on board, the people of the village did not suspect foul play. After the chief was captured, some of the crew tried to persuade Stewart to take the ship away from Akaroa, but with so many armed Māori on board he did not dare to attempt this.

That night, Te Rauparaha and Te Hiko attacked the village. The canoes captured during the day, together with the ship's boats, left the Elizabeth between one and two in the morning carrying the war party ashore. Stewart accompanied them. The attack from the village was launched from two sides, taking the Ngāi Tahu completely by surprise. The slaughter continued until long after daylight. Then followed a cannibal feast, the bodies of the slain being cooked in hāngī, ovens dug in the ground, in the traditional Māori fashion. This was on 6 November 1830. That night the Ngāti Toa returned to the Elizabeth, carrying with them large flax baskets of cooked flesh – about one hundred baskets in all – which were stowed in the hold. They also had about 20 prisoners, who were added to those already on the ship. According to Tamihana Te Rauparaha, 600 of the Ngāi Tahu were killed in this attack; other estimates make the number about 200.

Stewart then sailed for Kapiti. On the voyage Tama-i-hara-nui and his wife, knowing what fate was in store for them all, strangled their daughter. The ship reached Kapiti on 11 November. The prisoners, excepting only Tama-i-hara-nui, were disembarked and distributed as slaves, and the baskets of flesh were taken ashore. Then followed another feast, which was witnessed by several European traders and by officers of Brigg's ship, the Dragon. The promised cargo of flax not being ready, Stewart held Tama-i-hara-nui on board until the last week in December. Then having received only 18 tons of the promised 50 tons, and apparently despairing of obtaining more, he handed over the Ngāi Tahu chief to Te Rauparaha. After being displayed in triumph at Kapiti and Otaki, Tama-i-hara-nui was first of all tortured, and then killed and eaten. His wife suffered the same fate.

==== Fall of Kaiapoi and Onawe ====
Even after the massacre at Akaroa and the killing of Tama-i-hara-nui, the Ngāi Tahu were not left in peace. A little more than a year later, in the early months of 1832, Te Rauparaha returned to the attack. (Note: According to Tamihana Te Rauparaha, the Ngāti Toa returned to Canterbury more than a year after Tama-i-hara-nui fell into their hands. The war party left Kapiti ‘at the time when the first Karaka was red, and by the time we reached Kaiapoi the potatoes were grown to full size.’ (Shortland MS. 96)) This time his purpose was to destroy Kaiapoi. Embarking a force of more than 600 men at Kapiti, he took his fleet of war canoes to the mouth of the Waipara River, and then marched quickly down the coast to Kaiapoi, hoping to take the pā by surprise. However, although the pā was only thinly manned, most of the warriors having gone to Whakaraupō to escort Taiaroa on the first stage of his return to Otago, warning was given of some skirmishes by gunshots, and the gates were closed as the invaders arrived.

Before Te Rauparaha could make a full-scale attack, the Kaiapoi force returned, accompanied by Taiaroa's men, and made their way into the pā from the rear by wading across the lagoon. Two frontal assaults having failed, Te Rauparaha began a siege of the pā, which lasted three months. During this time Taiaroa made a bold sortie to the Waipara, hoping to destroy the invaders' canoes, but light axes could make little impression on the heavy hull timbers of large war canoes, and torrential rain made it impossible to burn them. As the siege seemed likely to be protracted it was decided that Taiaroa should return to Otago, then bring up reinforcements.

Finding that any direct assault was too open to the fire of the defenders, Te Rauparaha set his men to sap up to the walls. At first many were lost in this work, but by covering the trenches, and breaking their line with zig-zags, the head of the sap was at last brought to within a few feet of the pā. Large quantities of manuka brushwood were cut, tied in small bundles, taken to the head of the sap, and thrown into the trench against the palisades. For a time, the defenders were able to remove the greater part of this brushwood at night, but in the end the quantity was greater than they could deal with. Realising that with the first southerly wind the invaders would fire the brushwood and thereby burn down the palisades, the Ngāi Tahu tried the desperate expedient of firing it themselves when the wind was nor'west, and driving away from the pā. But the wind changed suddenly, the palisades caught fire – the 100-year-old timbers burning rapidly – and in the smoke and confusion Te Rauparaha's men got inside the pā before the defence could be reorganised. Of Kaiapoi's population of about 1000, only 200 or so escaped, making their way through the lagoon under cover of the smoke. The greater part of the remainder were killed.

Within a few days, during which skirmishing parties tracked down and killed many of those who had escaped from Kaiapoi, Te Rauparaha moved on to attack the last remaining Ngāi Tahu stronghold, at Onawe peninsula, in Akaroa Harbour. Construction of this pā, which was defended by about 400 men, was begun by the Māori of Akaroa and the surrounding district after Te Rauparaha's first raids. Its attractiveness as a defensive position in the warfare of the period is indicated by the fact that the French in 1838 gave Onawe the name of 'Mount Gibraltar'. Yet it was a deadly trap. For the attack Te Rauparaha divided his forces between the bays on either side of the tongue of land leading out to the peninsula. An unwise sortie of Ngāi Tahu under Tangatahara was beaten back to the pā. Just as the gates were being opened to allow them in, Te Rauparaha and the other Ngāti Toa pressed up close, using a party of captives from Kaiapoi as a screen. With their fire masked by the captives, the defenders delayed too long, and before they could act decisively, some of the northern warriors were inside the pā. Few of the Ngāi Tahu escaped the slaughter that followed.

To complete their conquest, the invaders sent mopping-up parties to most of the Ngāi Tahu villages on Banks Peninsula and in the surrounding district. When they returned to the North Island they left no occupying force, but took with them a large number of captives. Of the once numerous Ngāi Tahu only a remnant – those who had managed to escape into the dense forests of Banks Peninsula – now remained in North Canterbury. The fall of Kaiapoi had come too quickly after the departure of Taiaroa for any relief to be organised from Otago.

Sometime later, however, a party of 270 Ngāi Tahu warriors, under the leadership of Tūhawaiki and Karetai, travelled by canoe from Otago up the Awatere River, their purpose being to ambush Te Rauparaha, who was known to visit the Grassmere lagoon at that time of the year to catch waterfowl. Te Rauparaha escaped by hiding in a bed of kelp, and the raiders returned home after an indecisive skirmish. Tūhawaiki later led even larger war parties to the north, and in one of them inflicted severe losses on the Ngāti Toa at Port Underwood. Akaroa and Peraki were ports of call for these expeditions, and the vessels used for the last two of them, in 1838 and 1839, included as many as fifteen whaleboats.

About 1839 Te Rauparaha made peace with the Ngāi Tahu, sending back to the south the chiefs Momo and Iwikau, (Note: Momo late in 1831 had travelled from Akaroa to Otago in the flax-trader Vittoria to seek assistance from the Ngāi Tahu for the defence of Kaiapoi against the expected attack by Te Rauparaha (Joseph price, M.S. Livres)) and others of the more important among his captives. The Ngāti Toa and Ngāti Awa at this time began to come under the influence of the missionaries, and released their Ngāi Tahu slaves. Most of the returning Ngāi Tahu went to Banks Peninsula, Port Levy becoming the most populous settlement. They were a broken people, and could not hope to build again the Māori society that had been destroyed by Te Rauparaha's raids, and they had to face a new factor, the coming of the Pākehā.

== Whalers and sealers ==
Whaling at Banks Peninsula began in the mid-1830s. At least one ship, the Juno, was whaling off Banks Peninsula in 1831. Whaling from the Harbours of Banks Peninsula appears to have been pioneered in 1835 by two Weller ships. In that year, the Lucy Ann, after whaling from Port Cooper, left for Sydney on 22 September with 90 tons of oil. After 1835, Port Cooper and Akaroa were visited by considerable numbers of whaling ships, and Banks Peninsula rated second only to Cloudy Bay as a whaling base. In 1836, at least 11 whaleships were at Banks Peninsula, four being American. The 1836 whaling season brought to Port Cooper two whaling captains. The first was Captain George Hempleman who in 1837 established at Peraki the earliest shore whaling stations on Banks Peninsula, this becoming the first permanent European settlement in Canterbury. The second was Captain George Rhodes who gained such a favourable impression of the pastoral possibilities of Banks peninsula, that he returned in November 1839 to establish a cattle station at Akaroa. Hempleman's permanent establishment at Peraki had a special significance; whereas the ships represented merely transient European contact with this part of New Zealand, the shore stations were beginnings of European occupation of the land.

At Peraki on 22 March 1837, Clayton induced a Māori chief named Tohow (Tuauau) to transfer to him all rights to Peraki bay and the country for three miles (4.8 km) inland. The payment for the land was ‘arms and ammunition and other property’. It was by virtue of this purchase that Hempleman occupied Peraki. Clayton extended his purchase on 21 October 1837. In this second purchase, Tuauau professed to transfer to Clayton the whole of Banks Peninsula, the payment again being arms and ammunition. Leathart, master of the Dublin Packet, witnesses both these deeds.

A bond entered into on 24 October 1837 shows that Hempleman was under obligation to supply whale oil and bone to Clayton to satisfy a debt for whaling gear, and also that he occupied Peraki under licence from Clayton. After Clayton left Peraki, the Māori forced Hempleman, under threat of violence, to make a further payment for the right of occupation. Hempleton regarded this as the beginning of a purchase of Peraki on his own account. At Peraki the men, assisted by Māori, were first of all employed in erecting storehouses and a house for the captain, and in setting up try-works. The shore party brought its first whale ashore on 17 April. By 7 June 11 more whales had been taken. The figures had doubled by the time the season ended. Clayton then returned to pick up the whaling gang, and sailed with it to Sydney on 23 October. Hempleman and his wife, with eight other Europeans, remained at the Bay.

The year 1838 showed a further increase to 26 ships. The number of Americans had more than doubled, but that season is notable for the first appearance on the New Zealand coast of large numbers of French whaleships. A single French ship, the Mississippi, had worked from Cloudy Bay in 1836, but in 1838 she returned as one of a fleet of 16 French whaleships. Among these was the Cachalot, commanded by Jean Langlois, whose land purchase from the Māori led to the French attempt to establish a Colony at Akaroa in 1840. The number of French ships sharply increased in 1841 and 1842 after the establishment of the French settlement at Akaroa. In the first four months of 1843, there were 17 French, and ten American whaleships out of a total of 26. After 1843, foreign whaleships no longer came to New Zealand due to the enforcement of Customs regulations.

== French at Akaroa ==
French writers and politicians had for years been urging that Britain should not be left to monopolise New Zealand. Some had suggested that even if Britain took the North Island, there was no reason why France should not colonise the South. When news of the success of the French whaling fleet in New Zealand waters in the 1838 season reached France in 1839, a solid commercial project was added to all the others – a project which its promoters who had land to sell, hoped would develop into a scheme for effective French colonisation.

Leaving France towards the end of 1837 and sailing by way of the Cape of Good Hope, the French vessel Cachalot reached New Zealand waters in April 1838. For some time she was whaling off-shore, near the Chatham Islands, but in May came to Banks Peninsula. With them, to protect their interests, and to act as arbiter in any disputes, was the French corvette Héroine, commanded by captain Jean-Baptiste Cécille, which reached Akaroa in June. Cécille occupied much of the time of his officers and crew in making accurate charts of the harbours, first of all of Akaroa and then of Port Cooper (which he named Tokolabo) and Port Levy. At Port Cooper he established an observatory on shore in the bay just inside the heads, now called Little Port Cooper, but for which his name was ‘Waita’.

Little Port Cooper was used as an anchorage by most of the French ships working from Port Cooper in 1838 and in subsequent years, and it was apparently there that Langlois anchored when the Cachalot came into harbour in July 1838. While at Port Cooper, Langlois negotiated with the Māori for the purchase of the whole of Banks Peninsula, and a deed of sale was entered into on 2 August. The deed was signed by 11 Māori who claimed to be the owners of the whole of Banks Peninsula, although they lived at Port Cooper. Their leader was the chief Taikare, known as King Chigary. The total payment was to be 1000 francs (then equivalent to 40 pounds), a first installment of goods to the value of 150 francs to be paid immediately and the balance when Langlois took possession of the property. This first instalment comprised a woollen overcoat, six pairs of linen trousers, a dozen waterproof hats, two pairs of shoes, a pistol, two woollen shirts, and a waterproof coat.

The territory transferred was defined as "Banks Peninsula and its dependencies", only burial grounds being reserved for the Māori. Langlois considered that he had purchased 30,000 acres (120 km^{2}) but the total area is nearer 300,000 acres (1,200 km^{2}). At the time of the execution of the deed, Captain Cécille subsequently and enthusiastically hoisted the French flag on shore and issued a declaration of French sovereignty over Banks Peninsula. At the end of the 1838 whaling season Langlois left New Zealand waters, and on arriving in France some time after June 1839, set to work to market the property which he had bought from the Māori. He succeeded in interesting the marquis de las Marismas Aguado, a financier who had considerable influence with the Government. The Marquis set out to enlist support in Bordeaux for the formation of a company to exploit the property represented by Langlois's deed: the purpose of that settlement would be to establish on Banks Peninsula a settlement to serve as a base for French whaleships and other vessels in the Pacific Ocean. The difficulties of this first stage of the negotiations, in which rather too much dependency was placed on government action and aid, caused the Marquis to withdraw from the project.

On 13 October, Langlois also approached Admiral Duperré and Marshall Soult (President of the Council), stating that he had promises of support from Le Havre and that he would be able to make an offer acceptable to the Government. Almost at the same time, another influential financier, the Ducs Decazes, informed that the Bordeaux group was prepared to support the project. Finally the members of the Bordeaux group, joined with others from Nantes reached an agreement with Langlois, and on 8 November 1839, La Compagnie de Bordeaux et de nantes pour la Colonisation de l’Île du Sud de la Nouvelle Zélande et ses Dépendances presented its petition to the Government. The company had a capital of one million francs. Langlois received one-fifth interest in the company in return for transferring to it all rights deriving from his deed of purchase.

The proposals were then examined by a commission of the Ministry of Marine, comprising Captains Petit-Thouars, J-B Cécille, and Roy, all of whom had special experience of the Pacific and of the supervision of French whaling interests. A draft agreement was worked out by the commissioners and the company's representatives which was approved on 11 December by the King, and by Marshall Soult, Admiral Duperré, and the Minister of Agriculture and Commerce.

Port Louis-Philippe (Akaroa) was named as the site of the settlement proposed in this agreement, in terms of which the Government undertook to make available to the Company the 550-ton storeship Mahé, renamed Comte de Paris, to provide 17 months rations for 80 men; to consider the properties of the French colonists as French properties and the colonists themselves as French subjects, and to treat the produce of their crops as if they were of French origin. To protect the colonists, a warship would be sent out in advance of the emigrant ship, and its commander would exercise the powers of Commissaire du Roi. The ports of the settlement were to be free to French ships for a term of 15 years. One-fourth of all the lands acquired were to be reserved to the Crown for the building of ports, hospitals and shipyards. The functions of the company as finally announced on 5 February 1840, were to buy land in New Zealand, to colonise the lands already bought in 1838 by Langlois, and to engage in the whale fishery.

Langlois also received two sets of instructions, one from Soult as Minister of Foreign Affairs, and one from Duperré as Minister of Marine. The texts read: "You will see to it that possession is taken in the name of France of all establishments formed in the Southern Island of New Zealand, and that the flag is flown upon them. You should also win over the chief Te Rauparaha and induce him to sell the lands under his control in the northern part of the South Island. There is great advantage in setting up establishments in various parts of the Island for acquisitions [of territory] will only go unchallenged where there is effective act of possession."

The colony at Akaroa was to be merely the starting point of the acquisition for France of a much larger portion of the South Island. This letter also made it clear that an extension of the proposed colony to include a penal settlement at the Chatham Islands was envisaged: "The King is still preoccupied with the idea and with the necessity of a place of deportation. He has strongly urged me not to leave his Ministers in peace until they have introduced a bill for the expedition to Chatham Island." Lavaud stated in reply that he thought it better for the penal settlement to be at Banks Peninsula, because of the remoteness of the Chathams and the lack of suitable anchorage there.

Meanwhile, a small body of emigrants "of the peasant and labouring classes" were enrolled. Each man was promised a grant of 5 acres (20,000 m^{2}) of land, with half that area for boys between the age of ten and 15 years. They were to be provided with their rations for a period of about a year after their arrival in the colony, and were to be furnished with arms. By January 1840, 63 emigrants were assembled at Rochefort. Six were described as Germans. The total comprised 14 married men and their families and 19 single men and youths. Even after the emigrants were assembled there were considerable delays in getting the ships away. Lavaud sailed on the corvette Aube on 19 February 1840; the Comte de Paris, commanded by Langlois, and with the French immigrants on board, made a false start on 6 March and after going aground, finally got away on 20 March. Because of the late departure of the ships, the French expedition was doomed to failure from the outset.

The reason why the Aube sailed ahead of the Comte de Paris was to "gain time for fear the British might get the start of them". Yet the New Zealand Company's survey ship Tory had sailed from Plymouth on 12 May 1839, before Langlois and his associates had made their first approach to the French government, and as early as June the British Government was considering sending Captain William Hobson to act as Lieutenant-Governor over such parts of New Zealand as might be acquired from the Māori. Hobson was notified of his appointment in August. He arrived at the Bay of Islands on 29 January 1840, and on 6 February the first signatures were placed on the Treaty of Waitangi. At that date, neither of the French ships had left France. While they were still on the high seas, in May 1840 Hobson proclaimed British sovereignty over the South Island by virtue of Captain Cook's discovery. The same month HMS Herald arrived at Akaroa, bringing Major Thomas Bunbury, who was carrying a copy of the Treaty of Waitangi for signature by the southern chiefs. At Akaroa it was signed by two chiefs, Iwikau and Tikao. Three weeks later at Cloudy Bay, Bunbury made a declaration of British sovereignty over the whole of the South Island, based upon the cession by the chiefs as signatories to the Treaty of Waitangi. It was not until 19 August that the French colonists were landed at Akaroa.

Much was done in getting the French settlers established. Allotments were laid out for them to the west of the stream where they had landed, in what is now known as the French town. As enough open land on the foreshore could not be found for all the settlers, the six Germans were allotted sections on the next bay to the west, now known as Takamatua, but until 1915 was called German Bay. The total area of the land taken up under the Nanto-Bordelaise Company at this time was 107 acres (0.43 km^{2}). Although they had no animals, the colonists were able to plant and prepare their gardens. In the following year de Belligny obtained four working bullocks from Sydney. Vegetable seeds and a number of young fruit trees – apples, pears, mulberry and nuts – as well as grape vines, had survived the voyage from France. Although Lavaud mentions that the ‘menagerie’ placed on board the Aube at Brest included not only the cattle, but geese, turkey cocks and hens, pigeons and even rabbits, it is not clear whether any of these survived.

The colonists arrived at a good time of the year to begin cultivation wherever the ground was cleared of timber, and within the first six weeks most of them had started their gardens. It was too late to sow grain, but they got their potatoes in, and sowed their vegetable seeds. Lavaud started at French Farm a larger garden to supply the needs of his crew. The colonists built their first rough huts, either of rough timber, or of wattle-and-daub. The spiritual needs of the settlement were cared for by the priests of the Catholic Mission, Fathers Comte and Tripe, one ministering to Māori and the other to Europeans.

== Early exploration and pastoral settlement ==
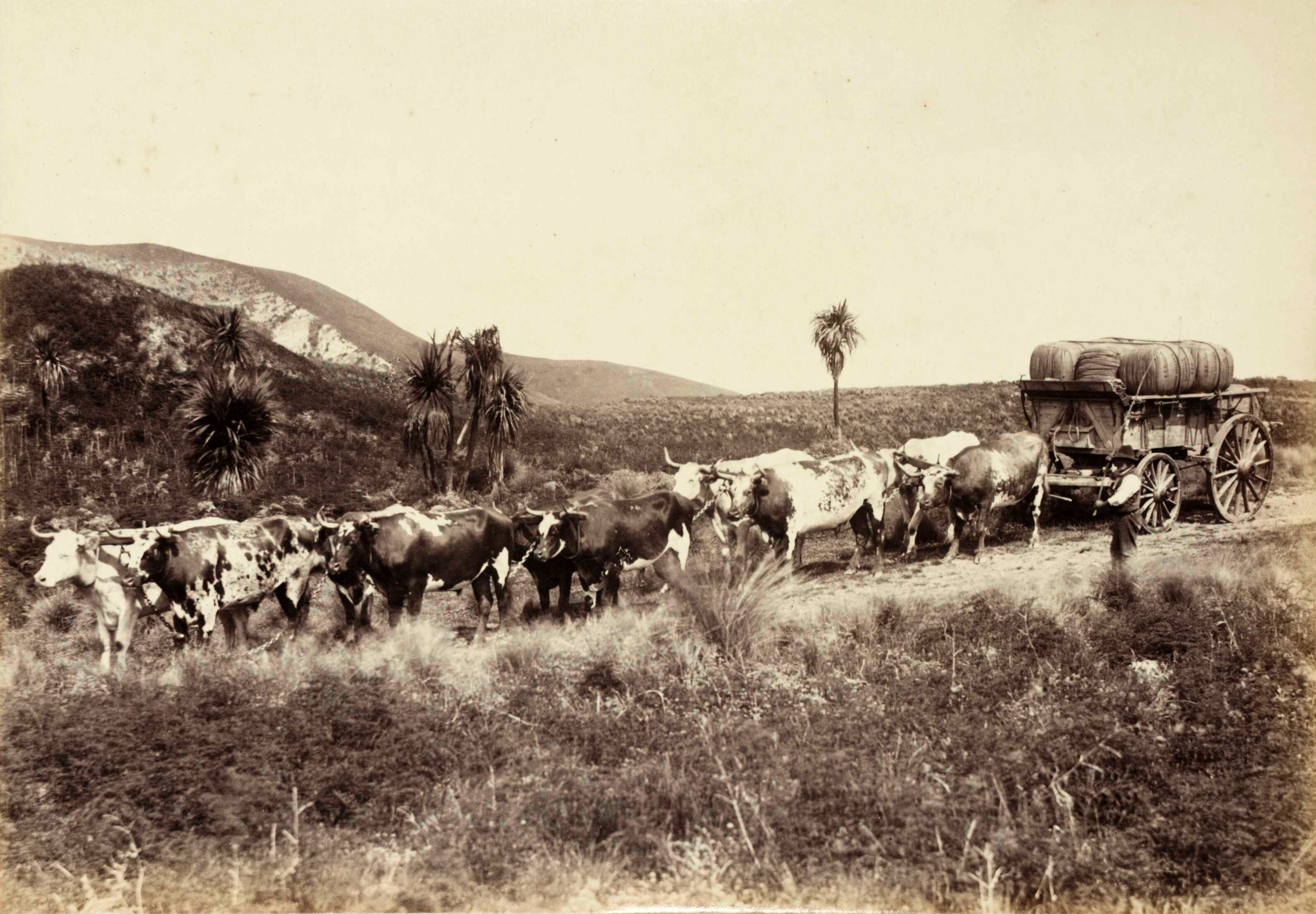
A bullock wagon in the Canterbury region in the 1880s.

The arrival of the French, creating at Akaroa a centre of European population both larger and more permanent than the whaling stations, not only led to a fairly frequent movement of whaling schooners between Wellington and Banks Peninsula, but attracted attention to the district as a possible site for British settlement. The first examination of Port Cooper and the adjoining plains for this purpose was made by Captain E. Daniel and G. Duppa in August 1841. seeking a site for the Nelson settlement for the New Zealand Company, they left Wellington on 28 June, and visited only Port Cooper and Port Levy, having no time to go further. In his report to Colonel William Wakefield, chief agent of the New Zealand Company, Captain Daniel stated that a road to the plains could be made through a gap on the hills on the western sides of the harbour between the peninsula and the snowy mountains. There was a ‘splendid district of flat land...covered with luxuriant vegetation’. The soil was of excellent quality, and free from swamps of any importance. Duppa had gone eight miles (13 km) up one of the rivers draining the plain – either the Heathcote or the Avon. Several groves of trees were scattered on the plain, these groves becoming more numerous nearer the mountains. ‘The whole district backed by these stupendous Alps affords a scene of surpassing beauty’, Daniel added. "I do not believe a more splendid field for colonisation than the one I have endeavoured to describe is likely to be met with".

Having received this report, Colonel Wakefield applied to the Governor to be permitted to place the Nelson settlement at Port Cooper. Hobson left Wellington for Akaroa on 11 September and did not deal with this matter until after his return a fortnight later. He then informed Wakefield that as Banks Peninsula and the lands about Port Cooper were subject to several undecided land claims, including those of the French or Nanto-Bordelaise Company, the Crown was not in a position to appropriate the land for the purposes of a new settlement. He had suggested earlier that a suitable site might be found at the Thames, in the Auckland district. Wakefield rejected this alternative, and decided to place the settlement at Blind Bay, which was already within the company's territory.

A year later another examination of the Port Cooper and Banks Peninsula district, to assess its suitability for his own farming venture, was made by William Deans, a pioneering Wellington settler who had arrived by the Aurora in 1840. Deans sailed from Wellington on 15 July 1842 on the cutter Brothers, with Captain Bruce, which served the southern whaling stations. In this cruise, after visiting Port Cooper, Akaroa and the Banks Peninsula whaling stations, Deans went as far south as Jacobs River on Foveaux Strait. When he returned on 3 September the Wellington newspapers published a full report of his notes on the nine whaling stations he had visited, but confined reports on his remarks about the Port Cooper country to the statement: ‘We hear he brings highly favourable information of that locality.’ Yet it was the impression he gained of the Port Cooper district during this cruise, in which he had seen a great deal of the South Island, that confirmed Deans in the decision to settle there – a decision that led to the first effective occupation of the Canterbury Plains. He had found it impossible to get suitable land in Wellington and he had a very poor opinion of Nelson. Immediately after his return to Wellington he began preparations to break up his establishment at Eastbourne, on Wellington harbour, and to transfer it to Port Cooper.

Within a fortnight of Deans' return from the south, the Surveyor-General to the New Zealand Company, Captain W. Mein Smith, left Wellington to examine the harbours on the east side of the South Island. Deans' tour had been a private investigation; Captain Smith's was an official survey. Unfortunately, after completing the southern part of his work, covering the coast between Akaroa and Stewart Island / Rakiura, Captain Smith lost his charts, field books, and surveying instruments in the wreck of the cutter Brothers inside Akaroa heads on 10 November 1842. He then went by boat to Pigeon Bay, Port Levy, and Port Cooper. Without his instruments he could do no surveying. He made sketches of the harbour, however, and supplied a fairly full report to Colonel Wakefield. Summing up his report, he states: ‘Should it be the intention of the New Zealand Company to establish a settlement in New Munster, Akaroa will be found best suited for the purpose.’

After this, it was nearly 18 months before there was any further official investigation of Canterbury as a site for organised settlement. In the interim, a small group of enterprising Wellington settlers, of whom William Deans was the first, decided that the risks and the hardship of isolation involved in settling in the south were preferable to the slow frittering away of their resources in Wellington, where the uncertainty concerning the New Zealand Company's land claims and the hostility of the Māori made it virtually impossible for all but a few to obtain possession of land. By the beginning of 1843 William Deans was ready to move from Wellington to the site he had chosen on the Port Cooper – the same site that had been occupied in 1840 by Harriot and McGillivray. His brother had come out to Nelson in 1842, but was soon convinced that Port Cooper offered better prospects. While John awaited an opportunity to go to Sydney to buy sheep and cattle, William used the schooner Richmond, chartered by Captain Sinclair and Hay, which sailed from Wellington on 10 February 1843, taking William Deans and his two farm workers and their families to Banks Peninsula. Hay accompanied them to look for a place to settle. They put in at Port Levy, where European whalers were living among the Māori, and left the women and children there, while Deans went on to Akaroa to notify the resident magistrate of his proposed occupation of part of the plains. Before leaving Wellington he had asked the Administrator to approve his venture. He was given an assurance that there was ‘no objection to his “squatting” on land in New Munster not occupied by or in the immediate vicinity of the cultivations of the natives. After his return from Port Levy, Deans went along with Manson by boat to Sumner and up the Avon River. Alongside the Putaringamotu Bush they built a long slab house for the cattle and sheep that John Deans was bringing over from Sydney. The families of Gebbie and Manson were to move over to the plains in May 1843. Deans named the site Riccarton, after his native parish in Ayrshire.

On 17 June 1843, John Deans arrived at Port Cooper from New South Wales by the ship Princess Royal after the passage of 21 days from Newcastle. He landed at Rapaki 61 head of cattle, three mares, two sows, 43 sheep – the first sheep in Canterbury. What Ebenezer Hay, the owner of Richmond, saw of Banks Peninsula and the plains, during this voyage with William Deans convinced him that he could not do better than follow his example. Captain Sinclair was of the same mind and so both families began preparations to move from the Hutt Valley to Pigeon Bay on Banks Peninsula. The schooner later sailed back and took a further group of settlers from New South Wales. These were the Greenwood brothers who settled at Purau.

All three groups of settlers were stock-keepers rather than agriculturalists. The Deans brothers, on the plains, were certainly best situated for agriculture, but even though one of their early crops of two or 3 acres (12,000 m^{2}) yielded at the rate of 60 to 70 bushels an acre, markets for grain were too far off and transport too expensive to justify them in growing more than they needed for their own use. As stock-farmers, however, they were well established by February 1844, then having 76 cattle, three horses and 50 sheep.

At Pigeon bay, which was heavily timbered, with very little open ground, only cattle-grazing was possible. Here in 1844, Hay had 18 cows. By February 1844, they were grazing 50 cattle and 500 sheep. Within a few years all these settlers had much larger numbers of stock. Greenwood had about 1500 sheep towards the end of 1845 and Deans' cattle had increased to 130 head. At this time, Rhodes imported 400 sheep. Thereafter the number of sheep increased rapidly. Sheep, however, appear to have been regarded as an investment for the future rather than a major source of immediate income. Cattle, on the other hand, not only provided prospect of a future trade in beef animals, but an immediate return from dairying. Deans, for example, built immediately at Riccarton a cowshed with ten double bails, and at the end of his first season sent a consignment of cheese to Wellington.

Cheese-making was one of the main occupations of all these first farmers, not only at Riccarton, Port Cooper, and Pigeon bay, but at Rhodes's establishment at Akaroa. A trade in beef cattle developed first from Rhode's station, which was established more than three years earlier than the others, but by 1845 all of them were beginning to send fat cattle to the Wellington market.

Of the three groups of settlers on the north side of the Peninsula, only the Deans brothers appear to have come to an arrangement with the local Māori before occupying the land, and even this agreement does not appear to have been put in writing before 1845. William Deans however, always prepared to be on good terms with the Māori, possibly because he had taken the trouble to learn their language. As finally drafted in 1846 his agreement gave him a lease for 21 years of a tract of land extending across the plain ‘six miles in every direction’ from the tributaries of the Avon River. The rental was eight pounds a year. At Port Cooper, the Greenwood brothers squatted for nearly a year without attempting any arrangement with the Māori, and only entered into a lease at Edward Shortland's suggestion after the Māori had begun to threaten them in February 1844. The lease then negotiated provided for a yearly payment of six blankets and some printed calico of a total value of between three and four pounds. In return for this payment the Greenwood brothers were permitted to cultivate near their homestead at Purau, and to graze their stock on the surrounding hills. At Pigeon bay, Sinclair and Hay were occupying land which the Māori considered they had sold to the French, although this fact did not prevent them from demanding further payment from the two settlers.

The European population of what was known officially as the Akaroa district (comprising not only Akaroa but the whole of Banks Peninsula and the adjacent plains) remained almost static for several years. From a total of 245 in 1844, it had increased only to 265 in 1848. Most of this small growth was accounted for by natural increase, with some slight drift of sailors and others to the village of Akaroa. Of 88 men whose occupations were listed in 1848 only 18 were land proprietors, the remainder comprising 42 farm workers (shepherds, cattle-keepers etc.), five sawyers, and 13 seamen and fisherman. In April 1850, Akaroa received its first large accession of British settlers, when the ship Monarch carrying emigrants bound for Auckland, was forced to put into Akaroa to repair a damaged rudder. Forty one of the Monarch's passengers decided to remain at Akaroa. Even though the French were far outnumbered by the British, Akaroa still had a pleasantly foreign air when the first of the Canterbury Association's settlers visited it in 1851, finding in its long-settled look and in its natural beauty of its surroundings a delightful contrast to the bleak hills of Lyttelton and the swamp wastes of Christchurch.

=== Canterbury Association ===
The first colonists or settlers sent by the Canterbury Association arrived in December 1850 on the ship Charlotte Jane.

== 2010–2011 earthquakes ==
=== September 2010 ===
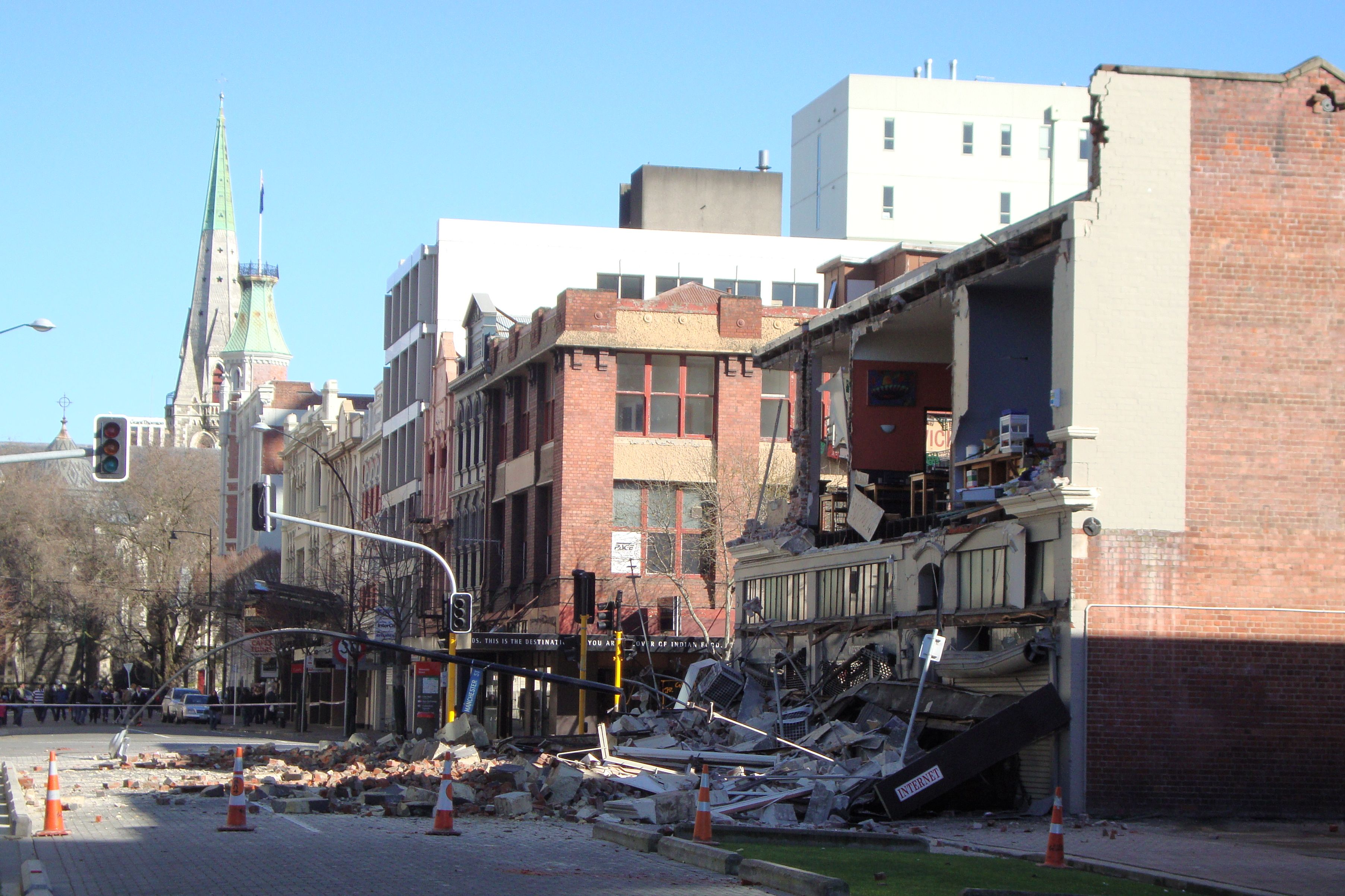
Building damage in Worcester Street, corner Manchester Street, with ChristChurch Cathedral in the background. (September 2010)

An earthquake with magnitude 7.1 occurred at Saturday 04:35 am local time, 4 September 2010 (16:35 UTC, 3 September 2010), at a depth of 10 kilometres (6.2 mi). The epicentre was located 40 kilometres (25 mi) west of Christchurch and 10 kilometres (6.2 mi) south-east of Darfield.

Sewers were damaged, gas and water lines were broken, and power to up to 75% of the city was disrupted. Among the facilities impacted by lack of power was the Christchurch Hospital, which was forced to use emergency generators in the immediate aftermath of the quake. Christchurch residents reported chimneys falling in through roofs, cracked ceilings and collapsed brick walls. There were no fatalities.

A local state of emergency was declared at 10:16 am on 4 September for the city, and evacuations of parts were planned to begin later in the day. People inside the Christchurch city centre were evacuated, and the city's central business district remained closed until 5 September. A curfew from 7 pm on 4 September to 7 am on 5 September was put in place. The New Zealand Army was also deployed to assist police and enforce the curfew. All schools were closed until 8 September so they could be checked. Christchurch International Airport was closed following the earthquake and flights in and out of it cancelled. It reopened at 1:30 pm following inspection of the main runway.

Sixty-three aftershocks were reported in the first 48 hours with three registering 5.2 magnitude. The total insurance costs of this event were estimated to be up to $11 billion according to the New Zealand Treasury.

=== February 2011 ===
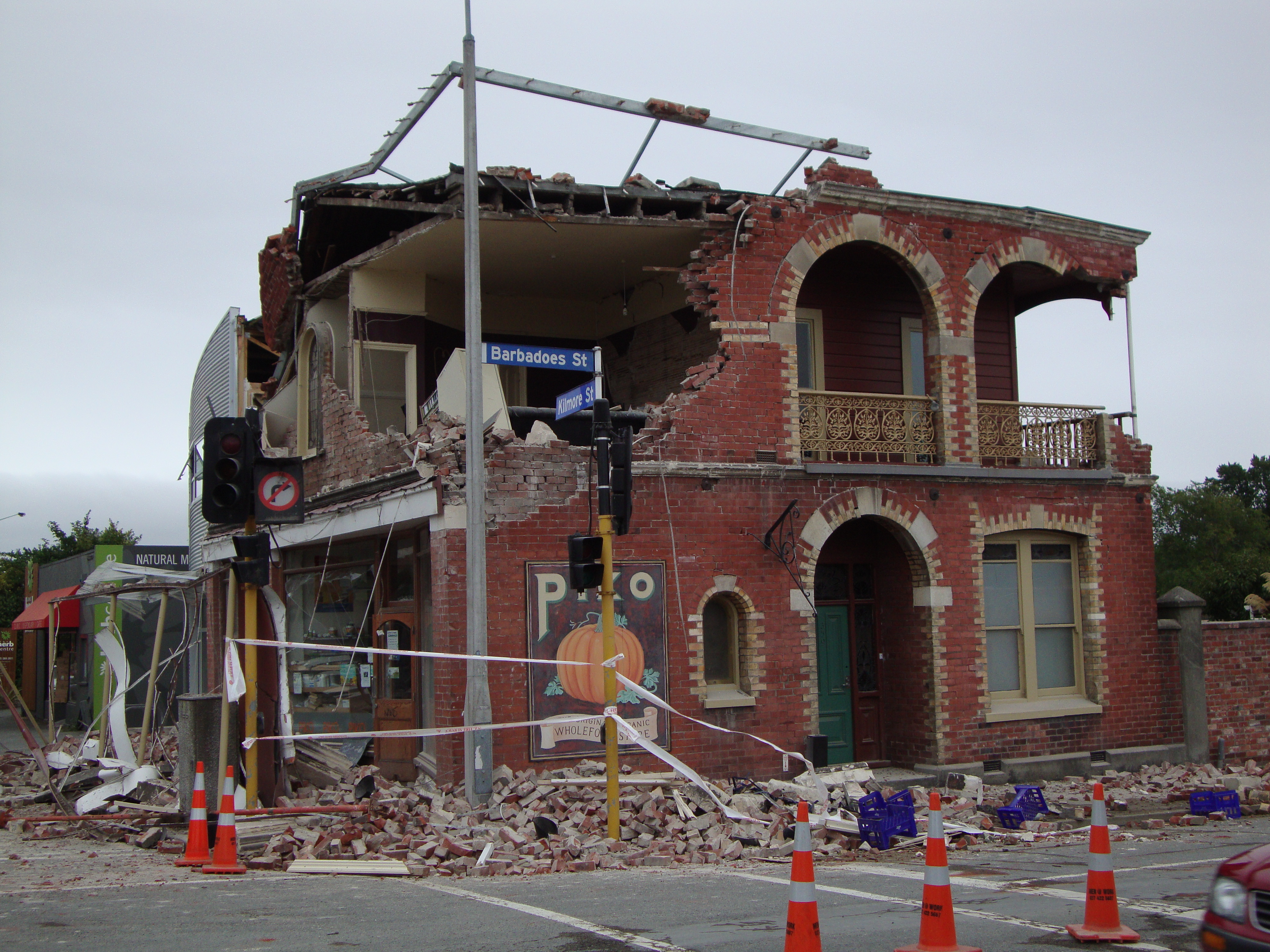
A store damaged in the February 2011 earthquake.

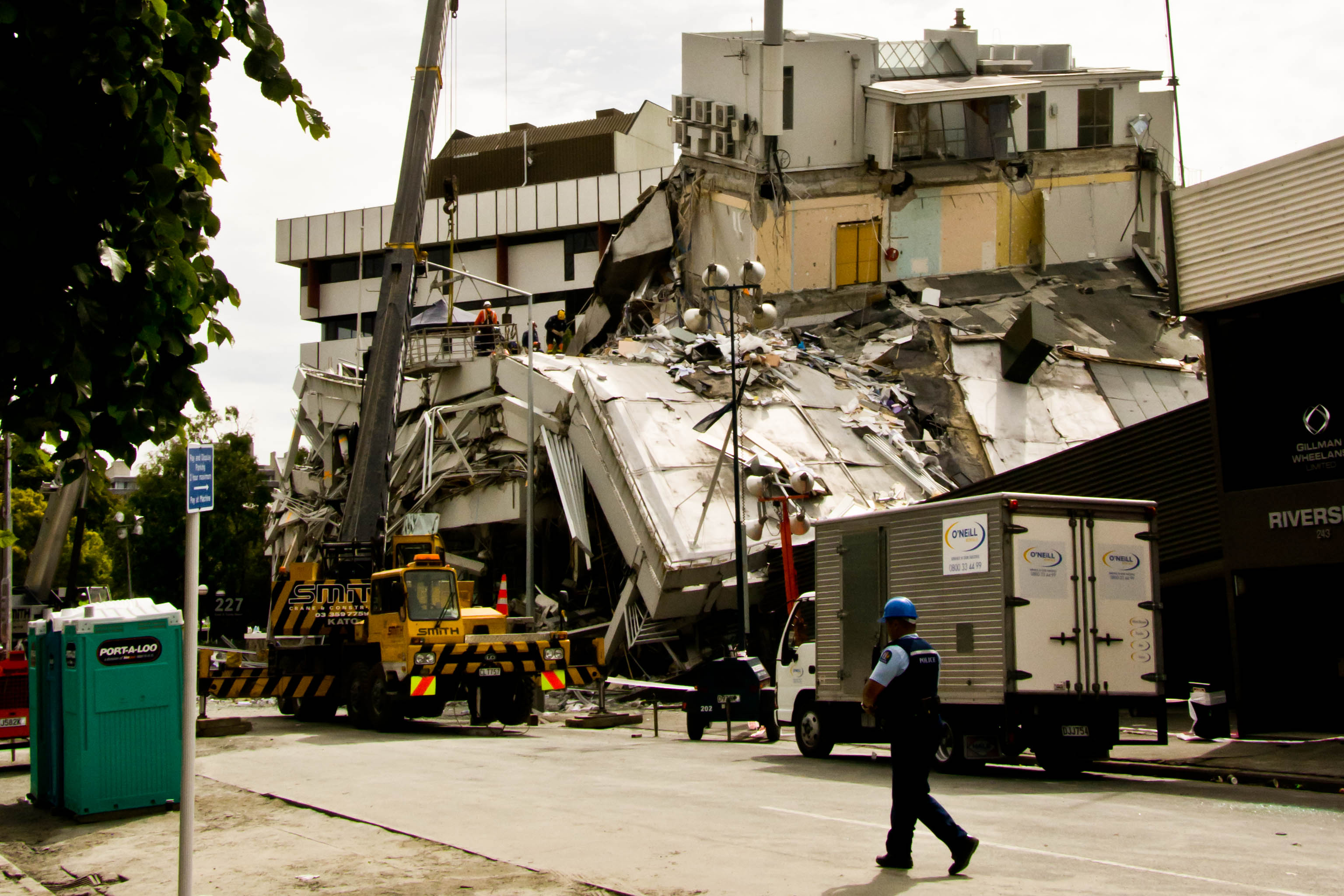
Pyne Gould Corporation Building, 24 February 2011

A large aftershock of magnitude 6.3 occurred on 22 February 2011 at 12:51 pm. It was centred just to the north of Lyttelton, 10 kilometres south east of Christchurch, at a depth of 5 km. Although lower on the moment magnitude scale than the quake of September 2010, the intensity and violence of the ground shaking was measured to be VIII (Severe) on the Mercalli intensity scale and was among the strongest ever recorded globally in an urban area due to the shallowness and proximity of the epicentre.

The quake struck on a busy weekday afternoon. This, along with the strength of the quakes, and proximity to the city centre, resulted in the deaths of 181 people. Many buildings and landmarks were severely damaged, including Christ Church Cathedral and the iconic Shag Rock. Early assessments indicated that about one third of buildings in the central business district would have to be demolished.

This event promptly resulted in the declaration of New Zealand's first National State of Emergency. The Royal New Zealand Navy was involved immediately. HMNZS Canterbury, which was docked at Lyttelton when the quake struck, was involved in providing local community assistance, in particular by providing hot meals.

After inspection, the runway at Christchurch airport was found to be in good order. Due to the demand of citizens wishing to leave the city, the national airline Air New Zealand, offered a $50 Domestic Standby airfare. The Air New Zealand CEO increased the domestic airline traffic from Christchurch to Wellington and Auckland. Thousands of people took up this offer to relocate temporarily in the wake of the event.

=== June 2011 ===
On 13 June 2011 at approximately 1:00 pm New Zealand time, Christchurch was rocked by a magnitude 5.7 quake, followed by a magnitude 6.3 quake at 2:20 pm, centred in a similar location as the February quake with a depth of 6.0 kilometres. Dozens of aftershocks occurred over the following days, including several over magnitude 4.

Phone lines and power were lost in some suburbs, and liquefaction surfaced, mainly in the eastern areas of the city which were worst affected following the aftershocks. Many residents in and around the hillside suburb of Sumner self-evacuated. Further damage was reported to buildings inside the cordoned central business district, with an estimate of 75 additional buildings needing demolition. Among the buildings further damaged was the Christchurch Cathedral, which lost its iconic rose window. There was one death and multiple injuries.
