= Te Pēhi Kupe =

Paramount Chief and leader of Ngāti Toa

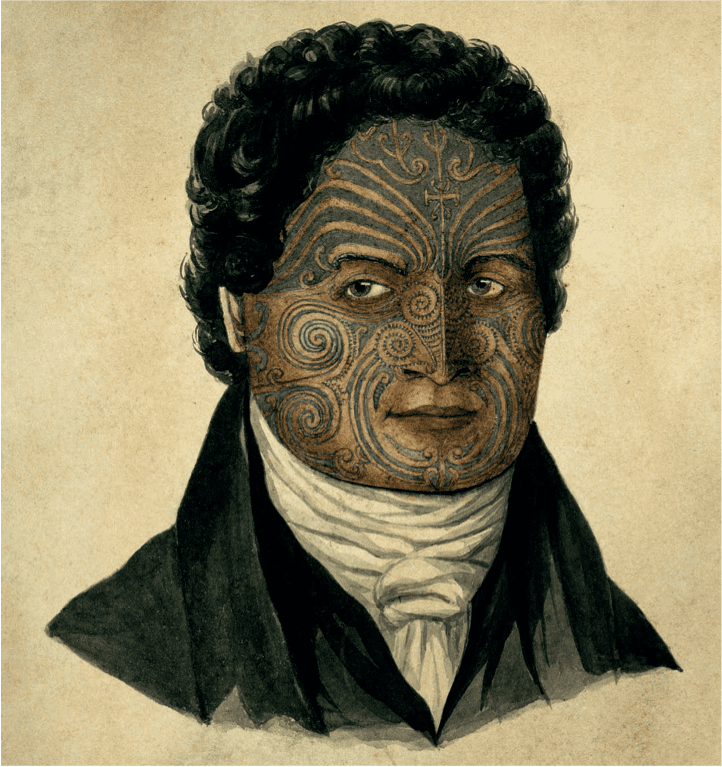
Te Pēhi Kupe. A watercolor portrait by John Sylvester. c. 1826. National Library of Australia

Te Pēhi Kupe (c. 1795–1828) was a Māori rangatira and war leader of Ngāti Toa. He took a leading part in the Musket Wars.

Born at Kāwhia, Te Pēhi Kupe was the elder son of Toitoi, son of Pikauterangi, and in the senior line of descent from Toarangatira, after whom Ngāti Toa is named. Te Pēhi's mother was Waipunāhau of Ngāti Mutunga in northern Taranaki. In his portrait painted in the mid-1820s he looks about 30, so it is estimated that he was born around 1795.

In 1819 he and other Ngāti Toa joined northern tribes on a war expedition that raided as far south as Wellington Harbour. After the Ngāti Toa party's return to Kāwhia, their region was attacked by Waikato and Ngāti Maniapoto. Ngāti Toa were defeated and migrated to Taranaki. From there they migrated to Horowhenua in 1822. Te Pēhi led the force that captured Kapiti Island from Muaūpoko and Ngāti Apa. When Ngāti Apa made a surprise attack on Ngāti Toa at Waikanae, four children of Te Pēhi were among the 60 of them killed, leaving Te Pēhi wanting revenge.

In 1824 he managed to brazenly force passage on a ship to England, where he was presented to George IV, learned to ride, recorded his moko and had his portrait painted. He was given presents, which he sold in Sydney on his return journey to purchase muskets and ammunition. By then his fellow Ngāti Toa chiefs Te Rauparaha and Te Rangihaeata had made peace with Ngāti Apa, but Te Pēhi attacked and plundered a Ngāti Apa pā anyway.

He was part of Te Rauparaha's 1828 raids on the South Island. After sacking the pā at Kaikōura and Omihi they went further south to the major Ngāi Tahu pā at Kaiapoi, where they announced that they wished to trade. In fact the Ngāti Toa intended to attack the inhabitants of Kaiapoi Pā in the morning. The Kaiapoi people were told of Ngāti Toa's intentions, and were already aware of the attacks on their people at Kaikōura. Several Ngāti Toa chiefs entered the pā to trade. Ngāi Tahu and Ngāti Toa accounts of what happened differ, but the outcome was that Ngāi Tahu killed Te Pēhi, Pōkaitara and Te Aratangata in the pā. Te Pēhi was killed by Tangatahara.

This incident led to the revenge raids by Te Rauparaha in 1830 with the capture of Tama-i-hara-nui from Takapūneke near present-day Akaroa and the three-month successful siege of Kaiapoi and sacking of Ōnawe the next year.
