= Ōnawe Peninsula =

New Zealand volcanic plug and sacred place

Ōnawe
- Wāhi Tapu, former Pā
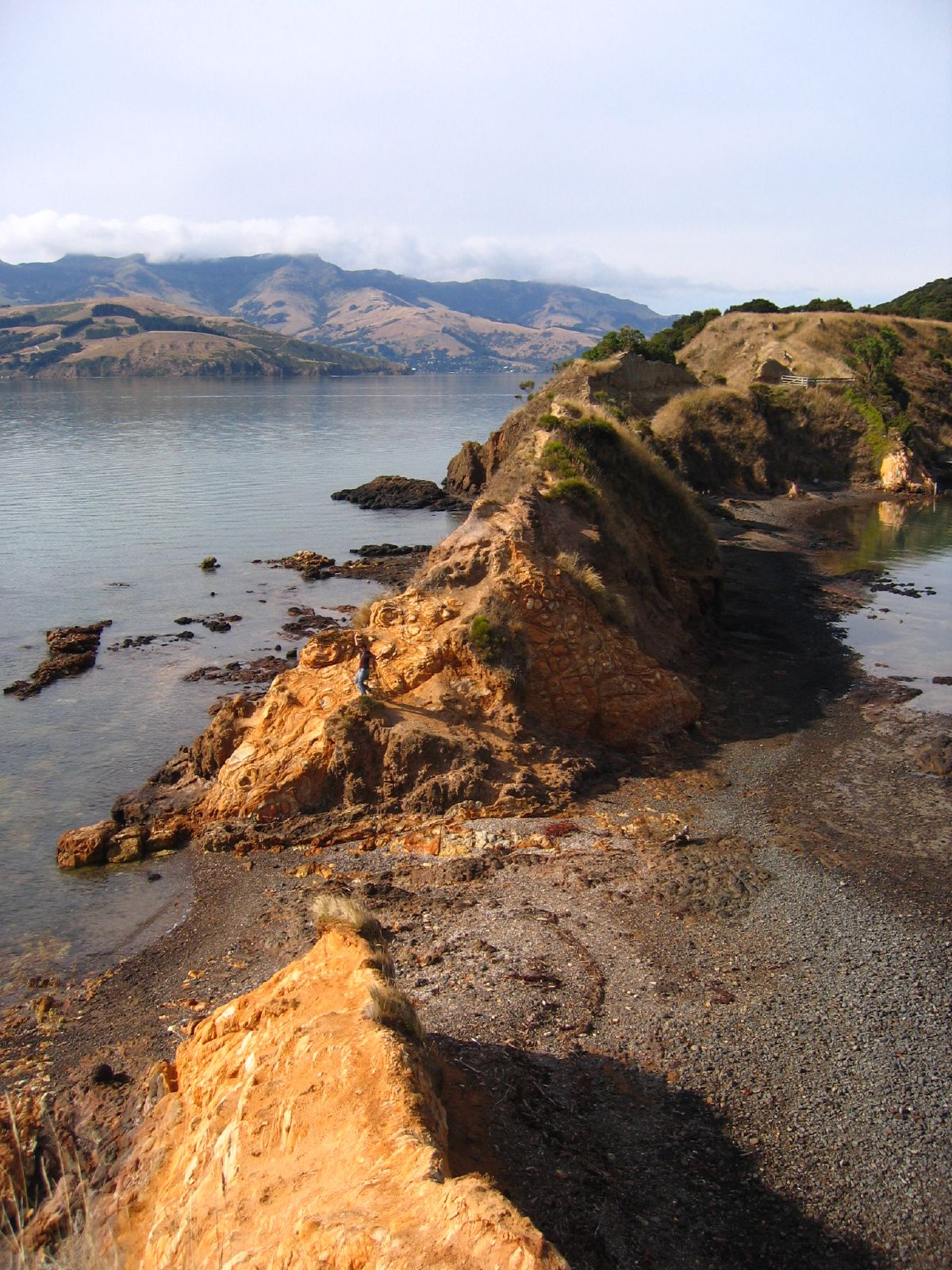
- Ōnawe Peninsula in 2007
- Ōnawe Peninsula, Akaroa Harbour, New Zealand
- Location within New Zealand
- Coordinates: 43.774°S 172.925°E

The Ōnawe Peninsula is a volcanic plug inside Akaroa Harbour, on Banks Peninsula in Canterbury, New Zealand. It is the site of a former pā (a fortified Māori village). It is part of the Banks Peninsula Volcano.

The New Zealand Ministry for Culture and Heritage explains that the name Ōnawe is made up of "Ō" meaning "place of" and "nawe" meaning "to set on fire".

It was the site of a Ngāi Tahu pā captured by Te Rauparaha, chief of the Ngāti Toa in 1831. Up to 1,200 people were killed here, and the land is sacred to Ngāi Tahu so "is deemed to be vested in Te Runanga o Ngāi Tahu" as part of the Ngāi Tahu Waitangi claims settlement in 1998.

The peninsula is only accessible at low tide; at high tide, the peninsula becomes an island.

== Historic Reserve ==
The Ngāi Tahu Claims Settlement Act 1998 vested this tapu (sacred) land to Te Runanga o Ngāi Tahu, as an historic reserve.

Visitors can explore this wāhi tapu (sacred land), but it is important to show respect by refraining from eating while there. It is encouraged to leave everything as one has found it and conduct oneself in a manner that reflects the wāhi tapu.

Access is from a car park located at the end of Onawe Flat Road, which branches off State Highway 75, approximately one hour by car from the city of Christchurch.

The taking or possessing of shellfish from the waters around the peninsula is prohibited under the Akaroa Taiāpure rules.

== Geology ==
The distinctive whale-shaped peninsula that juts out into the upper reaches of Akarao Harbour is the remnant of a cap on the Akaroa Volcano, which peaked erupting around 8 million years ago. After volcanic activity came to an end, erosion took its toll. Relentless waves, rain, and wind have re- shaped the finger of land seen today – a glimpse of the inner workings of an extinct volcano.

It is 1.2 kilometres (0.75 mi) long by .4 kilometres (0.25 mi) wide, and its highest point, at 106 metres (348 ft), has an unobstructed view out to the Akaroa Heads. It is about 24 hectares (59 acres) in area. The apex is called Te Pa Nui o Hau. Its literal translation combines "te" meaning "the”, "pa" which refers to a “fortified house”, "nui" meaning "big", "o" translating to "place of”, and "hau" meaning "wind”. Thus, it can be interpreted as "The great pā of hau". This name may be connected to the sound of pillar-like boulders make at its summit during a strong southerly wind.

The sea encircles it on three sides, with the east and west bordered by thick, sticky mudflats at low tide. To the north, a narrow neck connects it to the mainland, with an isthmus so narrow that access is only possible on foot, during low tide, and in a single file line. The isthmus is called Tara o Kura, made up of “tara” meaning “ridge” and “kura” “red”.

== Gallery ==
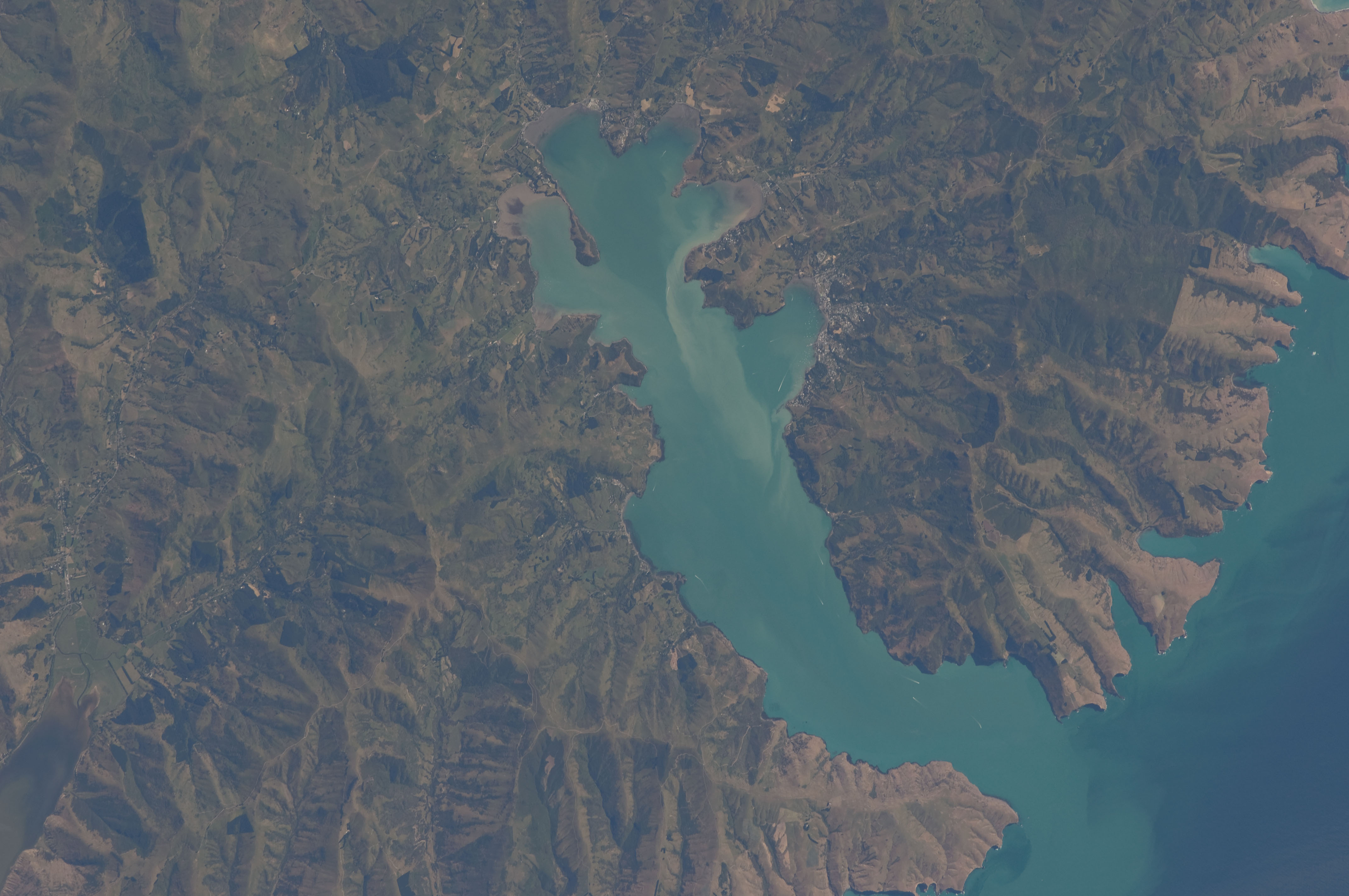
Satellite image of Akaroa Harbour taken from the International Space Station. Ōnawe Peninsula is visible at the centre top.

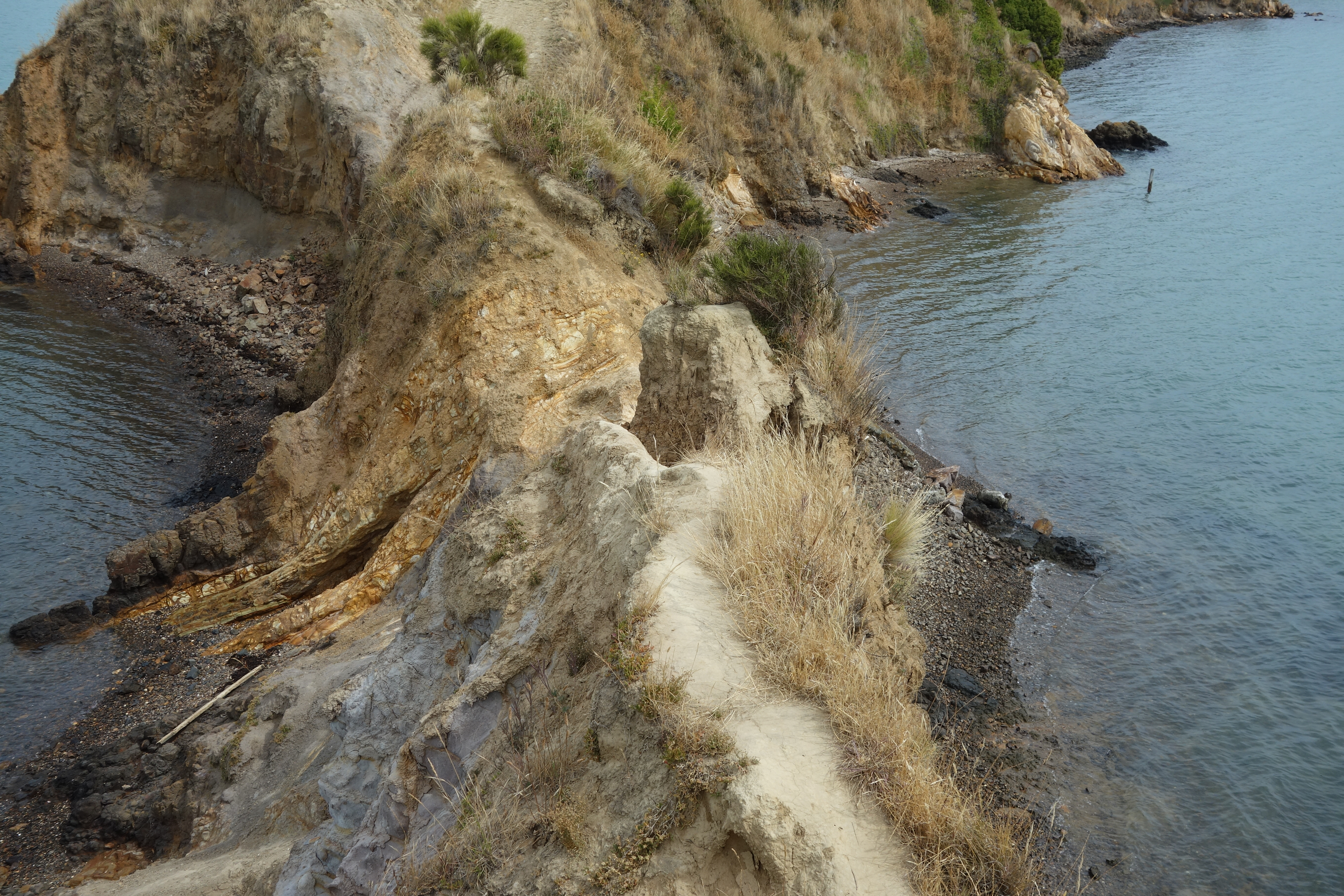
The track along the narrow neck

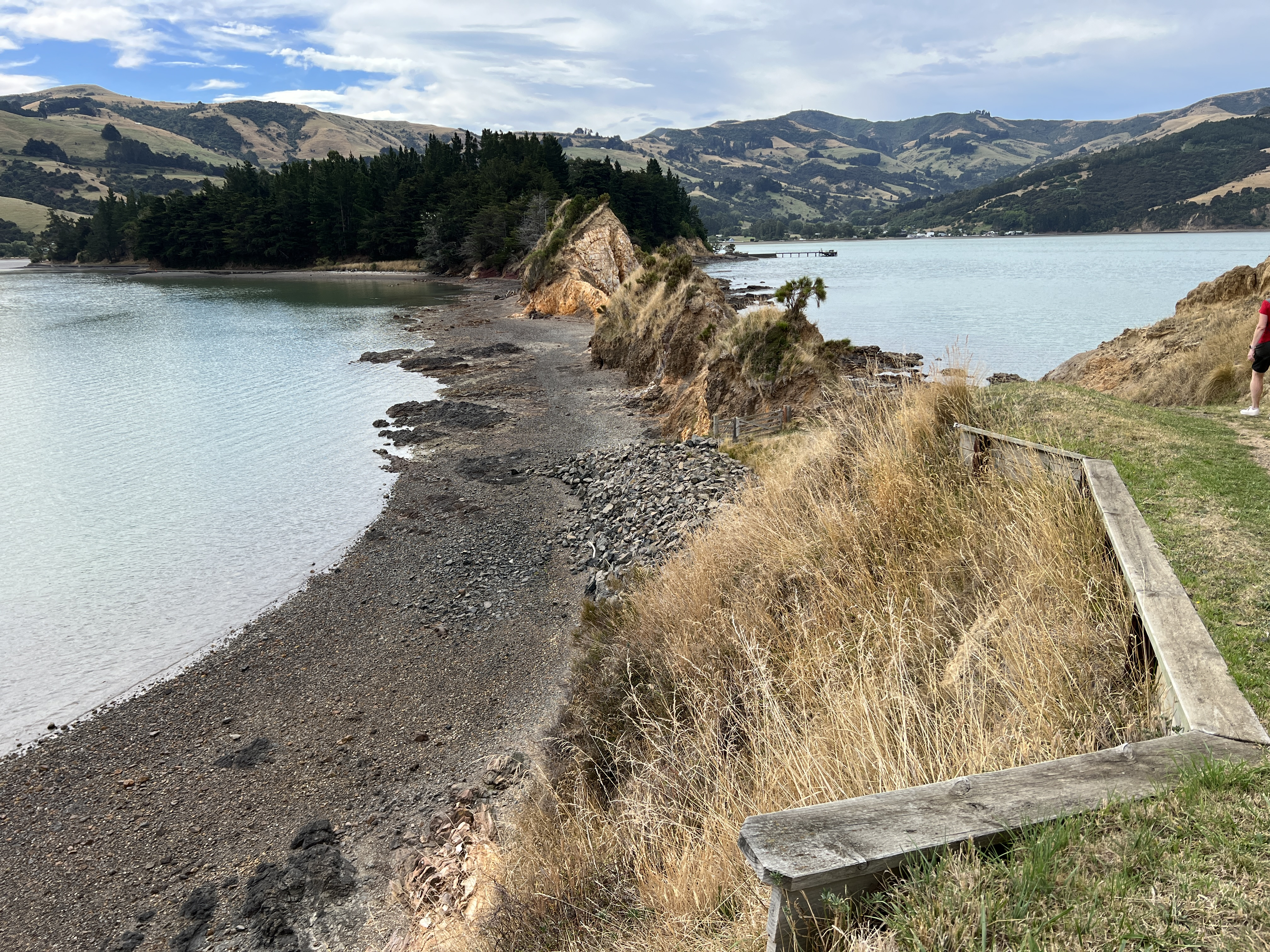
Looking north towards the narrow neck and isthmus

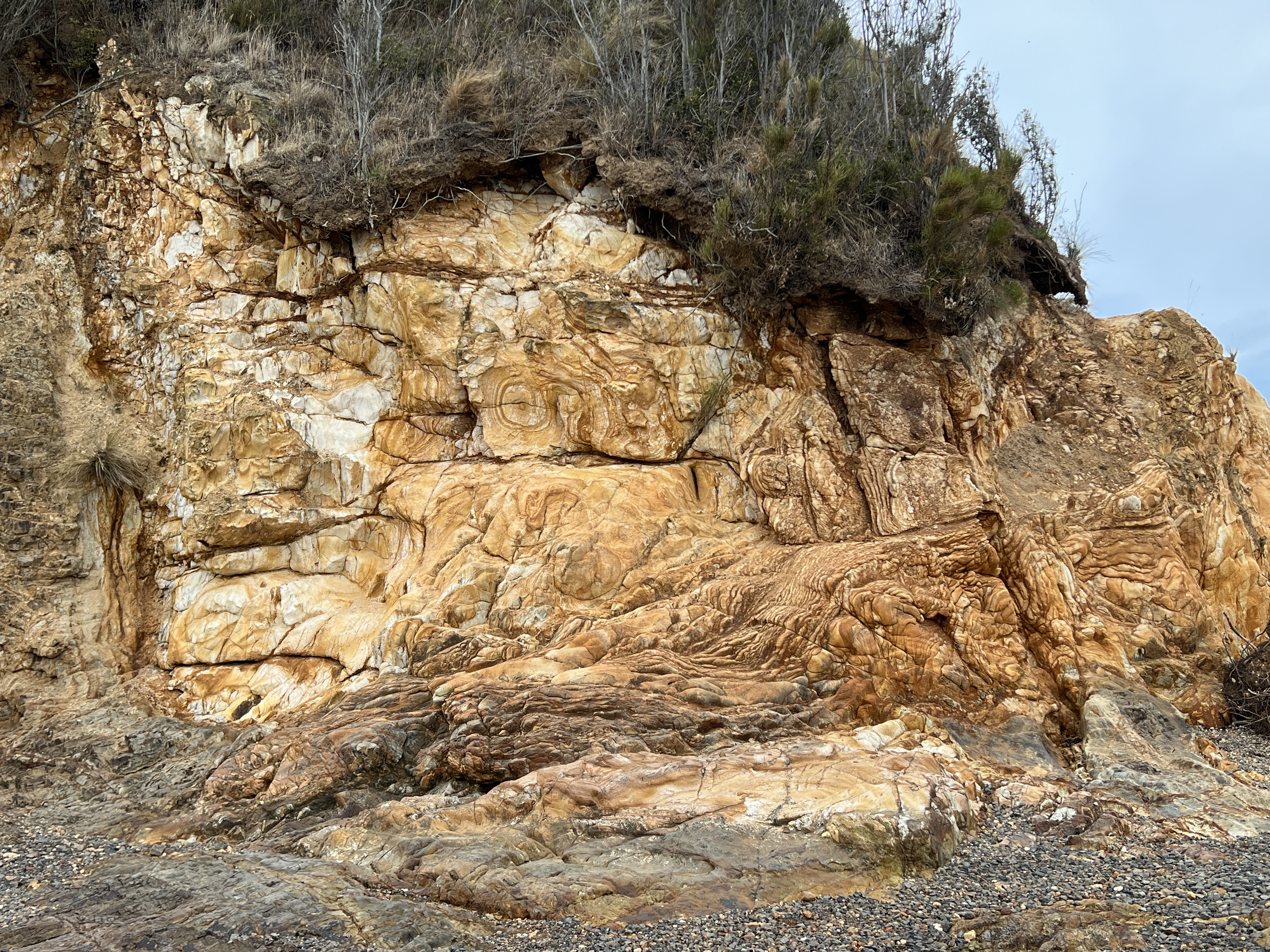
Close-ups of patterns in weathered trachyte

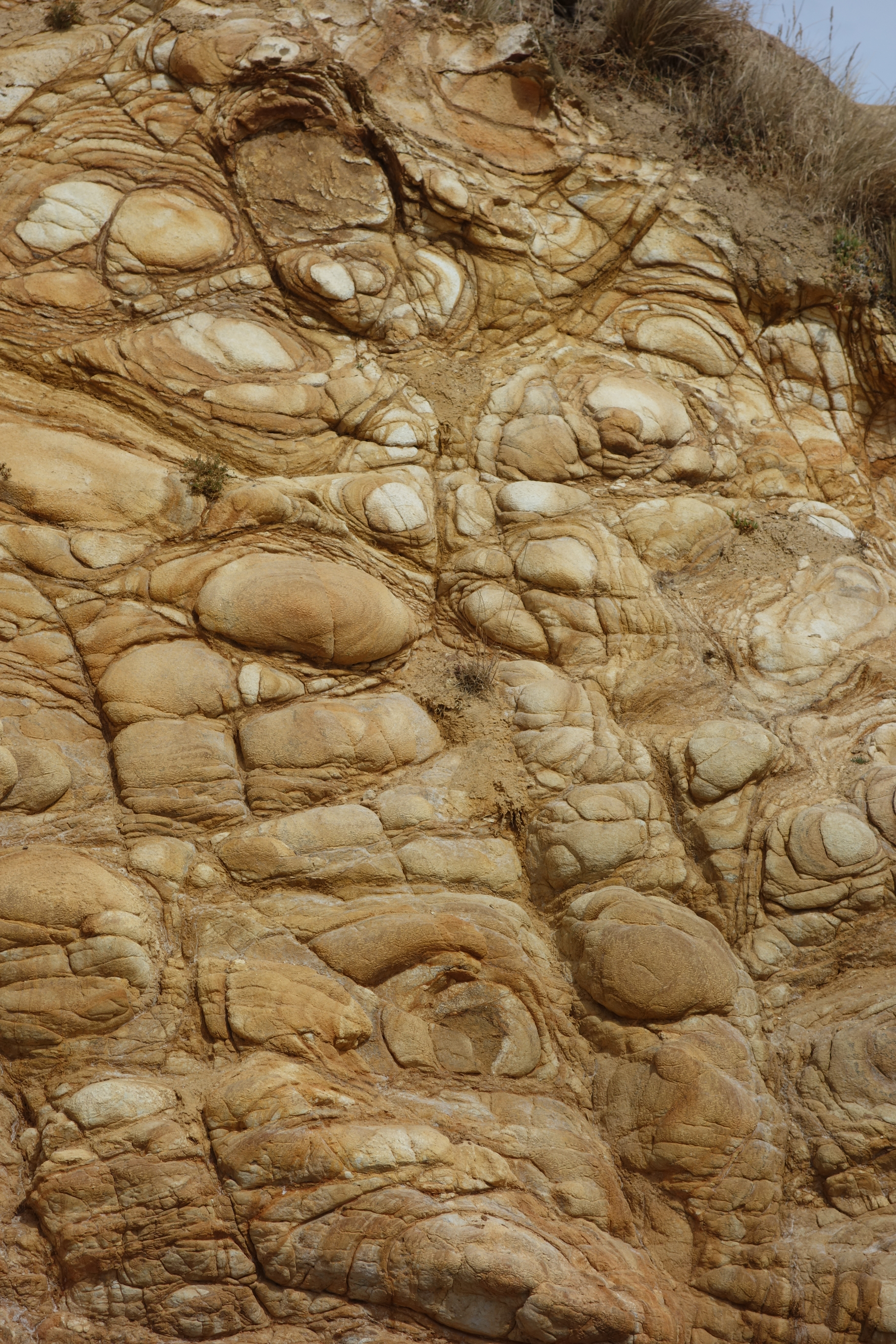

== History and culture ==
=== Early Māori history ===
A Ngāi Tahu oral history of Te Ukura, a maunga (mountain) that overlooks Ōnawe, recount the creation of ley-lines to Rāpaki, Tūwharetoa, and Te Arawa through the actions of Tamatea-Pokaiwhenua, which are linked to the Takitimu oral traditions. According to the legends, Tamatea, through karakia (prayers), summoned a fireball to provide warmth for his people. This fireball split into two: the first part carved out Whakaraupō, now known as Lyttelton Harbour, while the second landed at Te Ukura, shaping Whakaroa, which is known today as Akaroa Harbour. Hence, one interpretation of its name is "the place set on fire," while another literal translation is “your scars,” possibly referring to the impressions left by large volcanic boulders found at the northern end.

The first people to inhabit the Akaroa Harbour basin were several iwi (tribal groups) from the North Island, arriving some 700 years ago, with the last, the hapū (family, district groups or community) Ngāi Tūhaitara of the Ngāi Tahu iwi arriving in the 1730s. During that period, forests blanketed many of the volcanic hills, while the protected waters teemed with fish and shellfish.

The peninsula became part of the tribal area of the Ngāi Te Kahukura, Ngāi Tūahuriri (formerly Ngāi Tūhaitara) and Ngāti Irakehu hapū. In and around Ōnawe, these groups kept a wharau (unfortified shelters made from branches and leaves) in temporary encampments for gathering kaimoana (seafood), primarily flounder from the mudflats. Their main base was Wairewa (Little River) and Kaiapoi, a significant Māori settlement that served as the permanent home for the most prominent chiefly families. Consequently, the tragic downfall of the Kaiapoi Pā at the hands of Te Rauparaha is closely intertwined with the harbour whānau (extended or non-nuclear families).

=== Events leading up to the massacre ===
In the early 1800s, the Kaiapoi and Horomaka (Banks Peninsula) whānau divided against one another, and many had been killed in a bitter family feud. This feud prevented them from uniting together to face a bigger threat when, in 1827, the Ngāti Toa war chief Te Rauparaha began a series of raids and utu (revenge) attacks on Te Wai Pounamu / South Island.

The northerners had reached the Kaiapoi Pā, expressing their friendly intentions towards the local inhabitants. However, news had come through escapees from a skirmish at Omihi, revealing acts of slaughter and treachery committed by Te Rauparaha’s followers. In response, the leaders of the pā quickly gathered for a meeting and unanimously resolved to strike first. Two fighting rangatira (chiefs) from Akaroa, Te Maiharanui (Tama-i-hara-nui) and Tāngatahara, took action by targeting eight northern rangatira in a shocking and devastating assault against Te Rauparaha. He had never anticipated such a bold step. Consequently, he hurriedly retreated to his island stronghold on Kapiti Island, harbouring a deep resentment.

Concerned that Te Rauparaha might come back after he had captured Tama-i-hara-nui and pillaged Takepūneke, the remaining Horomaka constructed a pā (fortification) on the slopes of Ōnawe in 1831, and prepared themselves for a forlorn last stand. The peninsula's appeal as a strategic defensive position during the warfare of that era is highlighted by the French naming Ōnawe 'Mount Gibraltar' in 1838. However, in reality, it proved to be a perilous trap.

=== The building and stocking of the pā ===
Tāngatahara, who had slain Te Rauparaha’s uncle, Te Pēhi Kupe, at Kaiapoi Pā, was appointed to lead the defence. His lieutenants were known as Te Puaka and Te Potahi.

A trench was excavated around the shoreline, and robust wooden palisades were secured into the steep banks. Within the palisades, shelters were constructed to safeguard the defenders. A covered trench provided access to a water spring, while waka (canoes) were pulled inside, filled with water, and covered to minimize evaporation. Large amounts of food were also stored in whata (storehouses) and rua (storage pits).

The fortifications on Onawe consisted of two large oblong blocks, one of which was 8 chains long by 2 chains wide, and the other 10 chains long by 2 chains wide. There was also an irregular annexe, and the two blocks were divided by a formidable fence. The foregoing formed the main position. The area enclosed was three acres—the whole however was surrounded by a stout palisade, outside of which was a very deep trench. The palisades were about 16 feet high. One or two of these posts were still standing in January 1920, when Mr L. Dent and the author visited Onawe. The trenches outside the palisades were about 15 feet deep. At the sides of the fort were redoubts and other projections in order to strengthen the defence of the entrance gates. Two palisaded trenches gave access to the springs. The narrow neck entering Onawe was defended by a covered way.

— Taylor, William Anderson (1952). "Lore and History of the South Island Maori". p. 76.

The narrow end of Ōnawe was heavily guarded. An outpost and signal station were established at Opakia, a location across the water that offers a clear vantage point of the pā and coastline. Opakai marks the northern point of what is now referred to as Broughs Bay. The French, later, named Broughs Bay Petit Carenage due to its suitability for careening boats.

Of the eight guns in the pā, two belonged to the Whareki, one being an old, big-mouthed blunderbuss and the other a flint-fire. Amidst a widespread shortage of firearms, an Akaroa leader named Te Waakarapa made the decision to sell his daughter, Hinahina, to a Swedish sailor in exchange for a musket.

400 men-warriors, double that or more women, children and old men. Trench, bank, palisades, food, water, eight muskets. They waited.

=== The massacre ===
On an early April morning, sentinels at Opakia signalled that a fleet of enemy war waka was making their way up the harbour. It was Te Rauparaha, who, having wrapped up his siege at Kaiapoi Pā, was determined to eliminate any remaining Ngāi Tahu villages on Banks Peninsula. Having lost the element of surprise, he and his group landed near Barrys Bay to the west and set up camp.

Three hundred Te Ati Awa warriors, aligned with Te Rauparaha's mission, landed and set up camp to the east, at Te Wharau, a creek located on the Duvauchelle flat.

In an attempt to overcome the Te Ati Awa warriors, Tāngatahara abandoned his stronghold and led a party of warriors down the isthmus, a decision that, in hindsight, proved to be not only hasty but also unwise. Hidden sentries in the bushes sounded the alarm and summoned help from the Ngati Toa, who crossed the muddy beach, firing their muskets. Tahatiti was stot. Tāngatahara’s men, now under attack, retreated to the gates of the pā.

What happens next is shrouded in uncertainty. Several relations from Kaiapoi appeared, proclaiming that Te Rauparaha came in peace. However, this was a deception; while they were engaged in hongi, some northern warriors stealthily infiltrated the pā and initiated a brutal massacre. Hesitation and confusion ensued, as the Kaiapoi men were, in reality, captives, leading to speculation regarding their duplicity.

Defenders positioned high on Te Pa Nui o Hau opened fire with their eight muskets. Seven bullets found their targets, but the eighth, which was meant for Te Rauparaha, missed when Tara knocked aside the gun aimed at him by Te Puaka.

Few Ngāi Tahu survived. The young and strong were taken for slavery; the rest were slain on apex of boulders and on the flax flats at Barrys Bay, their bones a grim reminder.

This massacre, which has puzzled historians throughout the years, suggests a level of incompetence, naivety, and indecision from the defenders. Additionally, it reflects a lingering suspicions and hostility among the Kaiapoi captives stemming from the feud between Ngāi Tūahuriri and Ngāti Irakehu.

As far as the wretched Ngai Tahu were concerned, the Brown Napoleon had more than evened the score. He could have met his match at Onawe but its elaborate fortifications were never asked to withstand the test of battle.

— Gordon Olgivie, Banks Peninsula: cradle or Canterbury

The fall of Onawe raised more questions about leadership than about the potential of the pa defences… with the pa virtually impregnable in a siege, the defenders left the pa to attack the enemy and then retreated and allowed Raupahara to take the initiative and gain conquest out of confusion.

— Barry Brailfsord, The Tattooed Land

As a result, the harbour basin became sparsely populated, dwindling to just a few individuals who were ill-equipped to respond collectively to the arrival of Europeans. The massacres at Takapuneke and Onawe Pa had a profound impact on British policy and were among the contributing factors that ultimately led to the Treaty of Waitangi.

=== 1840 to 2008 ===
A small group of French settlers arrived in 1840 and grazed a flock of imported sheep on the peninsula, where fences were unnecessary. The first British owner of Ōnawe was Christopher Dampier, who sold it to William Birdling. Birdling farmed the land before passing it on to Patrick O'Callaghan, another farmer, and so on, to the Shadbolt and Kay families.

On 17 March 1891, O'Callaghan hosted a festival on Ōnawe. The Horomaka (Banks Peninsula) whanau were invited to join in, but commendably chose not to participate in this thoughtless celebration on sacred land.

Repeated requests were made from 1904 to 1981 for the government to buy the site and create an Historic Reserve. Eminent organisations and people, such as Christchurch Beautifying Society, Heaton Rhodes, William Anderson Taylor and the Kay family made these requests. When the Department of Lands and Survey acquired it in 1981, farming had compromised the pā defences. It gained heritage status in 2005, and was made a historic reserve in 2008, however, scant historical evidence is left, with only faint surface remnants.
