= Kaiapoi Pā =

Historic place in Canterbury, New Zealand

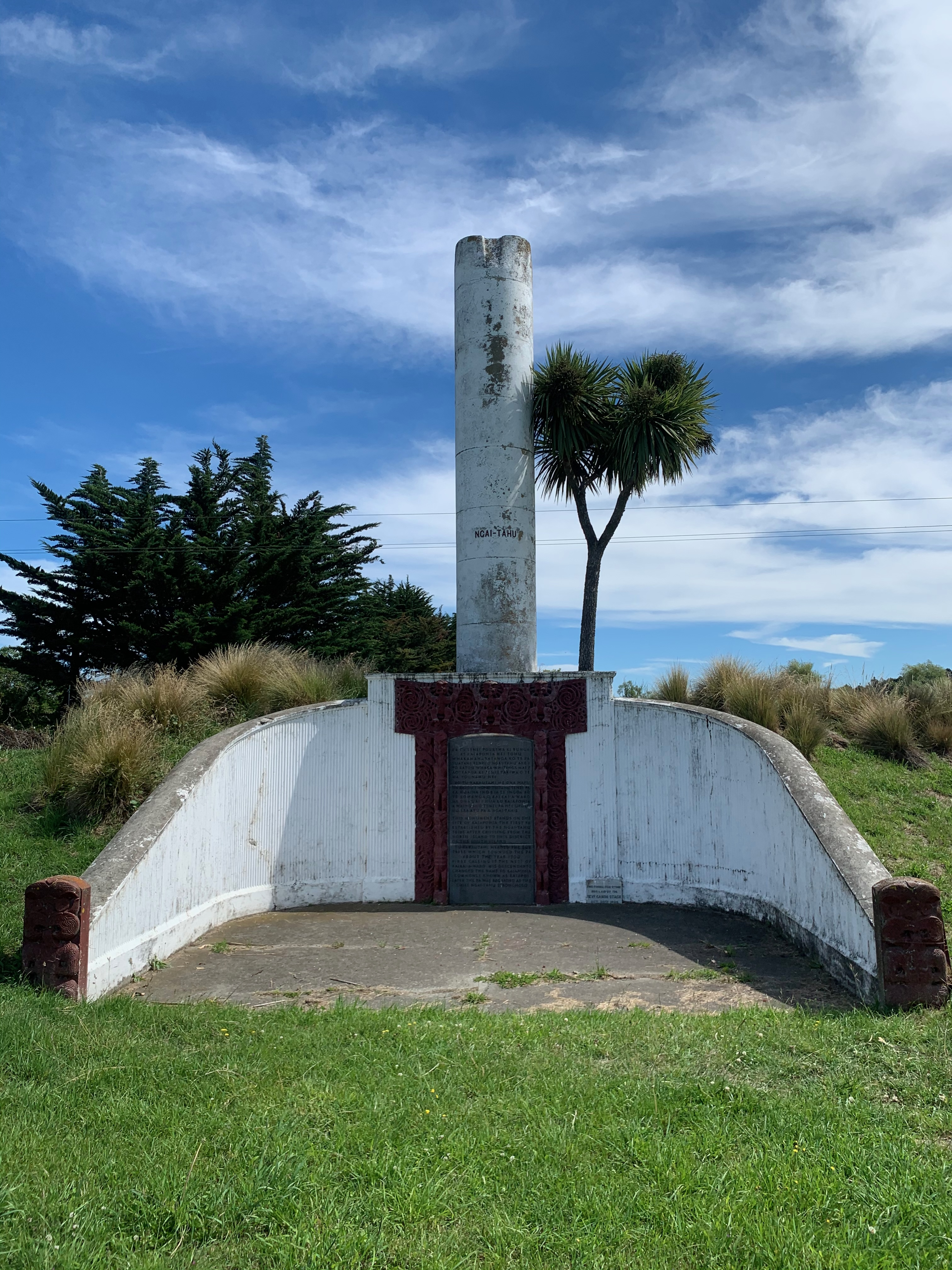
- Monument on the pā site, erected in 1898

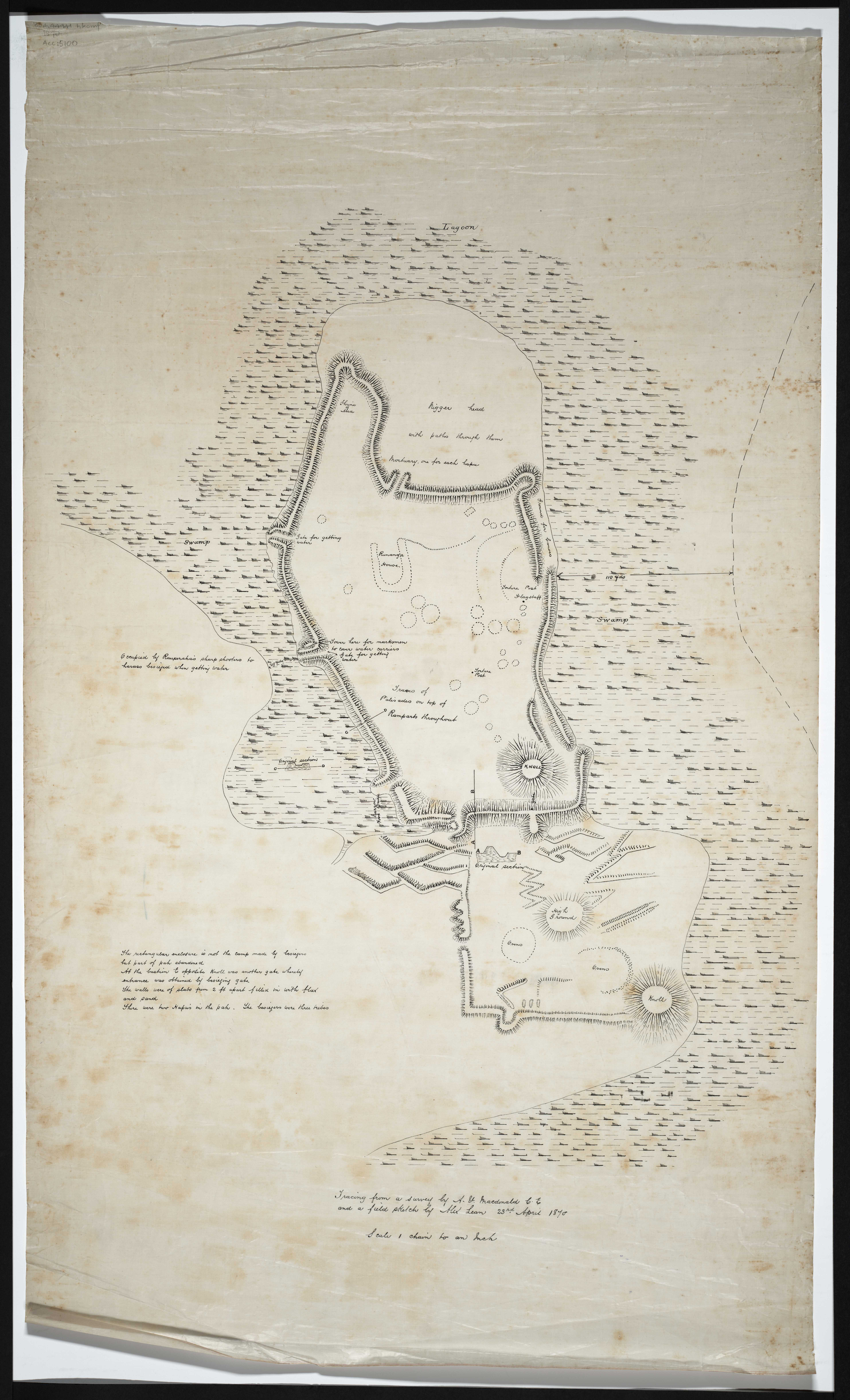
- A map of the pā drawn in 1870
- Interactive map of Kaiapoi Pā
- Type: Pā
- Location: Preeces Road, Waikuku, New Zealand
- Coordinates: 43°18′18″S 172°41′24″E
- Founded: c. 1700
- Owner: Ngāi Tahu

Heritage New Zealand – Category 2
- Official name: Kaiapohia
- Designated: 6 June 1994
- Reference no.: 5733

Heritage New Zealand – Category 2
- Official name: Kaiapohia Monument
- Designated: 9 September 1984
- Reference no.: 3793

Kaiapoi Pā is a historic pā (fort) site just north of the Waimakariri River in Canterbury, New Zealand. The pā was a major centre of trade and nobility for Ngāi Tahu in the Classical Māori period.

Established around 1700, the pā was sacked in 1832 by Ngāti Toa warriors led by Te Rauparaha. Today the pā site is a memorial reserve and is significant to local iwi. The nearby town of Kaiapoi is named after the pā.

== Description ==
The pā site is just north of modern-day town of Pegasus, and south-east of the town of Waikuku. It is approximately 8 kilometres (5.0 mi) north of the township of Kaiapoi, which derives its name from the pā. Before it was drained by European colonists to create farmland, the area was mostly extensive swamp, with some areas of grassland on higher dry ground.

The pā itself was roughly oblong in shape, angled to run south-west to north-east. The western, northern and eastern sides were surrounded by swamp, with the main entrance via higher ground at the south. The pā was surrounded by earthen banks topped with wooden palisades. At the south-eastern side was the Kaitangata gate, behind which was a watchtower. The other two main gates, named Hiakarere and Huirapa, were on either side of the south-western corner. Just to the south of this southern palisade was an area devoted to housing and ovens. Within the walls were the major wharenui which were built to face north. The ahu (shrine to the local deity) of the pā was at the northern end, with houses spread across the central area.

Today the pā site is an empty field, though remains of the earthworks can still be clearly seen. A large monument is located at the southern side close to the wall. The site itself is considered wāhi taonga (sacred) by the local iwi, and this is formally recognised in the district plan.

== History ==
=== Early history ===
Kaiapoi pā was established around the year 1700 by the Ngāi Tahu chief Tūrākautahi and became the largest fortified village in the South Island. The site was previously occupied by an earlier tribe's stronghold, that of either the Waitaha or Kāti Māmoe, both of which were absorbed by Ngāi Tahu through warfare and intermarriage. Tūrākautahi was the second son of Tūāhuriri, consequently Ngāi Tūāhuriri is the name of the hapū (subtribe) of this area. The pā was originally called Te Kōhaka-a-Kaikaiāwaro. This roughly translates to "The nest of Kaikaiāwaro". In Māori mythology, Kaikaiāwaro is a taniwha and kaitiaki that took the form of a dolphin or a bird.

The pā was a major centre of trade for Ngāi Tahu. The waterways of the Ashley River / Rakahuri and the surrounding Taerutu swamp were a convenient way of transporting goods for trade. The pā traded in pounamu from the Arahura River, tītī (muttonbird) from the islands around Stewart Island / Rakiura, and obsidian from Mayor Island / Tūhua. The pā itself cultivated sugar from cabbage tree roots, as well as kūmara. The trade in pounamu in particular gave the pā a reputation for great wealth. Many of the most important Ngāi Tahu whānau were based at Kaiapoi. By the early 1830s the pā had a population of around 1,000 people.

=== Conflict with Te Rauparaha ===
Te Rauparaha and his Ngāti Toa allies first attacked Ngāi Tahu at Omihi, south of Kaikōura, around c. 1827–28. Te Rauparaha had heard that the chief at Omihi, Rerewaka, boasted that he would disembowel Te Rauparaha if he ventured too far south. This insult demanded a response, and after arming himself with muskets Te Rauparaha and his men travelled south down the coast. By coincidence, the Ngāti Kurī people of Kaikōura were expecting a visit from the North Island hapū of Tū-te-pākihi-rangi of Ngāti Kahungunu and were not alarmed by the appearance of canoes offshore. At the beach, they were greeted by the fleet of canoes belonging to Ngāti Toa. Armed with muskets, the Ngāti Toa warriors were able to attack at a distance across the water. The pā was destroyed, with many of the occupants killed or sent back to Kapiti Island as slaves.

After destroying Omihi, Te Rauparaha and his allies proceeded to Kaiapoi, ostensibly to trade muskets for pounamu. The Kaiapoi people learned of the Omihi attack after Hakitara, a Ngāpuhi warrior who was staying with Ngāi Tahu at Kaiapoi pā, overheard the Ngāti Toa leaders preparing to attack the pā the following morning and snuck away from the Ngāti Toa warriors to warn the pā. Thanks to this forewarning, the Ngāi Tahu chief Te Maiharanui ordered a retaliatory attack, which led to the killings of all of the prominent Ngāti Toa chiefs except Te Rauparaha, who returned to Kapiti Island to plan his revenge.

In November 1830, he and his warriors massacred the Ngāi Tahu people of Takapūneke near present-day Akaroa. Encouraged, Te Rauparaha mounted a major expedition in the summer of 1831–32 against Kaiapoi Ngāi Tahu. He enlisted the help of warriors from Te Āti Awa and Ngāti Raukawa and led skirmishes against the iwi at the top of the South Island before returning to Kapiti. In early 1832 they travelled further south, landing at the mouth of the Waipara River. They sacked the major settlement at Tuahiwi and proceeded on to Kaiapoi. At the time, Ngāi Tūāhuriri were engaged in collecting food from all across Canterbury, and the attack from the northern tribe was unexpected.

The attackers laid siege to the pā, but were unable to breach the defences. The surrounding swamp limited which approaches they could take, and the only approaches on solid land were heavily fortified and exposed to musket fire from within the pā. The swamp also provided food for the defenders, who could have harvest eels and birds. As a result, the siege lasted three months. The attackers slowly approached the walls by sapping, and began piling up dry brushwood against the walls of the pā with the intention of burning it.

During autumn, the defenders waited for an opportunity when the wind was blowing from north-west, and lit the brushwood that had been piled up by their enemy. Their intention was to remove the threat of fire to the pā, while also driving back the attackers with the wind-blown smoke. This plan initially seemed to be successful, but the wind suddenly changed direction to the south, blowing the smoke and flames back against the pā. Te Rauparaha took advantage of the chaos and his men invaded the pā. The settlement was completely destroyed, with the occupants that had not managed to flee being killed and eaten or taken as slaves. Ngāti Toa then went for the tribes of Banks Peninsula and took the principal fort at Ōnawe, in Akaroa Harbour.

=== Later history ===
In 1848 the site was visited by Walter Mantell. He had been tasked with identifying the location of the northern boundary of Kemp's purchase of land from the South Island iwi. The deed specified that the iwi had sold all land as far north as 'Kaiapohia', but Kemp himself never visited the location and marked it as close to the Hurunui River. During his visit, Mantell stood in the middle of the former pā and argued about land ownership with representatives of Ngāi Tūāhiriri. He recorded the pā itself as a reserve belonging to Māori on his map. A monument to the pā was erected in 1898 by James Stack, who had been an Anglican missionary with the local iwi. The inscription on the monument reads:

KA TU TENEI POUREWA KI RUNGA
KI KAIAPOHIA HEI TOHU WHAKAMAHARATANGA KO TE PA TUATAHI TENEI O NGAI-TAHU AKE I TO RATOU WHAKA-WHITINGA MAI I AOTEAROA KI TENEI TAKIWA O TE WAIPOUNAMU NEI
KO TU-RAKAUTAHI ME ONA HAPU NA RATOU I NOHO TUTURU TENEI PA KA HUAINA IHO E IA TE INGOA KO TE KOHANGA O KAIKAI-A-WARO NA ONA URI I HUA KO KAIAPOHIA A WAIHO IHO TENEI PA HEI UPOKO MO ERA ATU PA A NGAI-TAHU

THIS MONUMENT STANDS ON THE SITE OF KAIAPOHIA THE FIRST PA ESTABLISHED BY THE NGAI-TAHU TRIBE AFTER CROSSING FROM THE NORTH ISLAND TO THIS DISTRICT OF THE SOUTH ISLAND
TU-RAKAUTAHI HEADED THE SUB TRIBE WHICH FOUNDED THE PA
ABOUT THE YEAR 1700 FIRST CALLING IT THE NEST OF KAIKAI-A-WARO • HIS DESCENDANTS CHANGED THE NAME TO KAIAPOHIA COMMONLY KNOWN AS KAIAPOI LATER THE PA WAS REGARDED AS THE CHIEF NGAI-TAHU STRONGHOLD

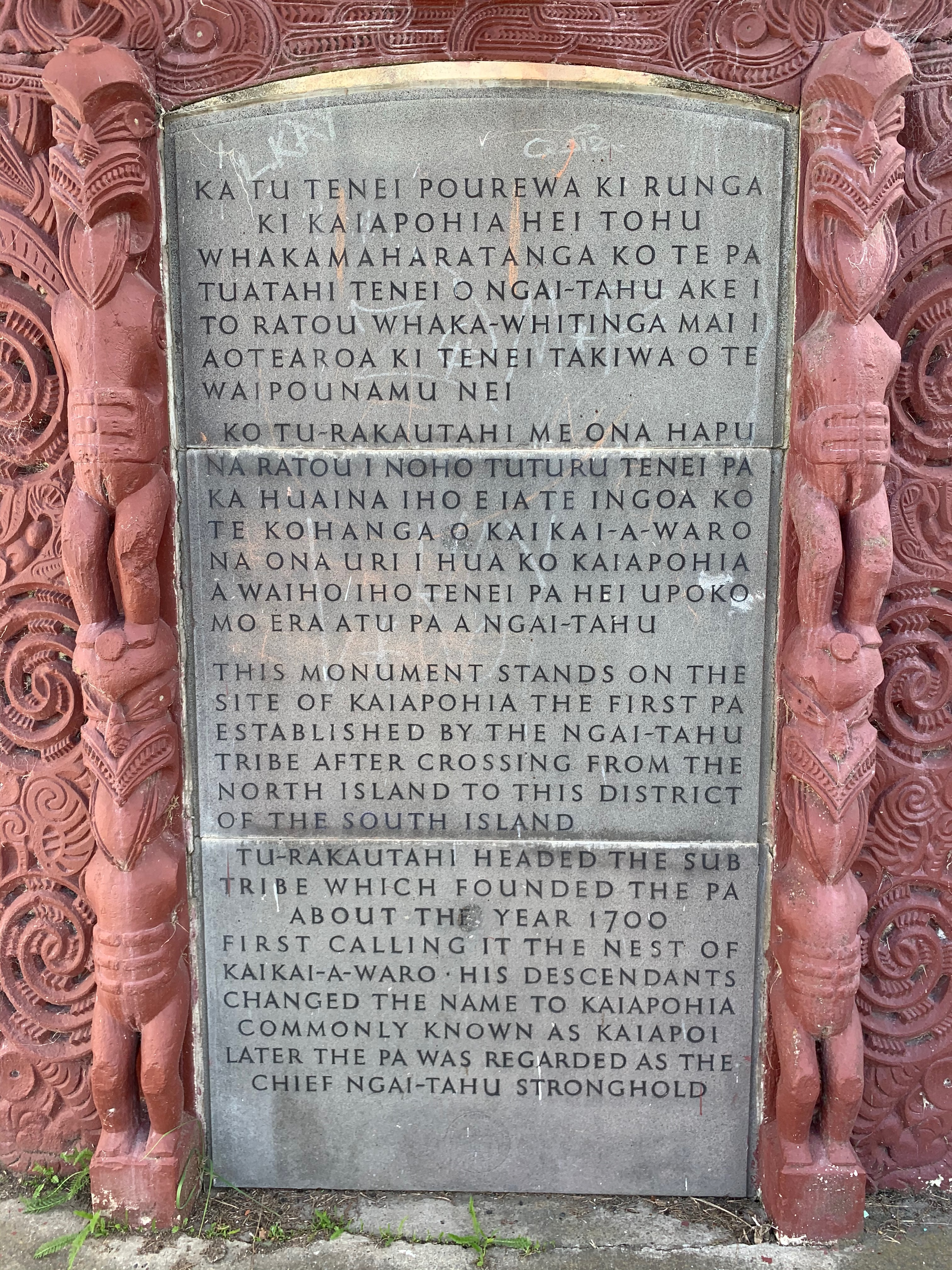
The inscription on the monument

During the mid-2000s the planned township of Pegasus was built very close to the pā site. The developers engaged with Ngāi Tūāhuriri to explore and document archaeological sites in the area. The tekoteko at the top of the monument was removed after the 2011 Christchurch earthquakes and is held by the Canterbury Museum, Christchurch. The site and the monument on it are both listed as Category-II historic places by Heritage New Zealand for their historical significance to Ngāi Tahu.

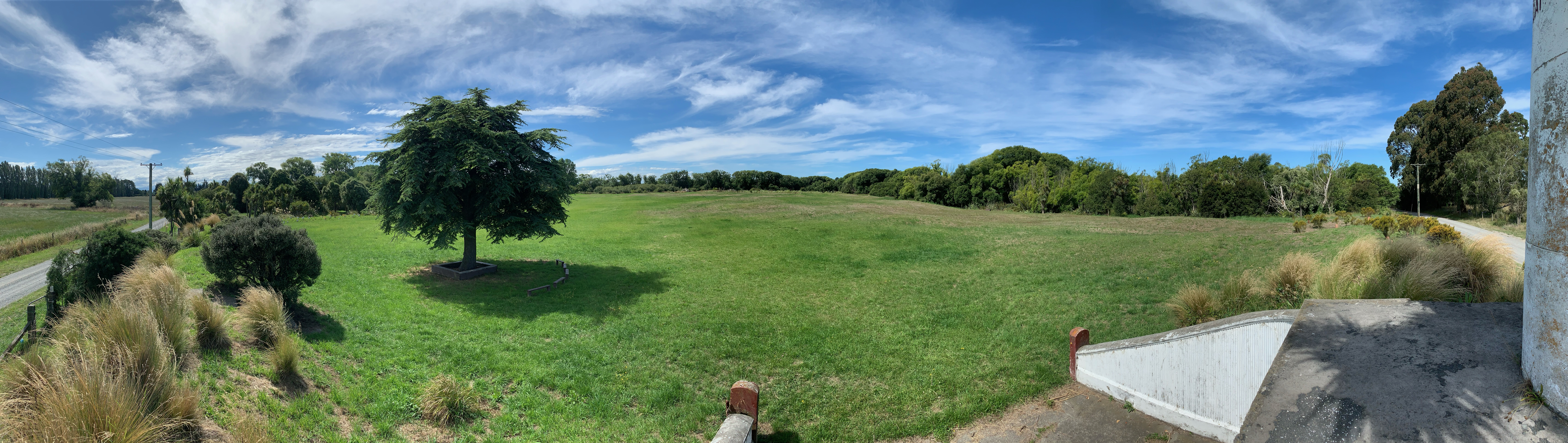
Panorama of the Kaiapoi Pā site in 2021, taken from the position of the monument looking north. The tree on the left is close to the position of the Huirapa gate. The former earthworks of the pā are visible as undulations in the ground.

== Toponymy ==
According to Ngāi Tahu tradition, the name was coined by Tūrākautahi. The name has two root words: kai (food) and poi (to swing or toss). When Tūrākautahi was challenged on his chosen location—which provided only eels and waterfowl but not any other food—he determined that food could be brought in from surrounding settlements. The name of the pā is often mistakenly given as "Kaiapohia", but the origin of this name was a curse against Ngāi Tahu by Ngāti Toa. Before embarking on his final raid on the pā, Te Rauparaha consulted with the Te Āti Awa tohunga Kukurarangi, who made a prophecy:

He aha te hau,
He uru, He tonga,
He parera Kai waho e,
Nau mai ra e Raha,
Kia kite koe i te Ahi,
I Papakura ki Kaiapohia

What is the wind?
It is north-east, it is south,
It is east in the offing, oh!
Come then, O Rauparaha!
That you may see the fire,
On the crimson flat of Kaiapohia.

—Kukurarangi, Te Ati Awa, Kapiti Island 1831

The final word—Kaiapohia—is a pun, which in this context can be translated as "piling up of bodies for eating". The roots are the noun kai and the verb apo (to gather together, with a connotation of greediness). The passivating verb ending -hia is used, which is an indicator of the word's North Island origins. This name was popularised in historical accounts by the Reverend Stack. He asserted it was the correct name, used it as the title of his book on the siege, and used the name in the monument on the pā site. However, there are no records of any Ngāi Tahu chiefs of the nineteenth century using the name. When asked in 1879, Natanahira Waruwarutu, who had lived at the pā, said, "It is the ignorance of the northern Māoris which has induced them to call it Kaiapohia." Stack had learned the Māori language in the North Island, and he described the southern name of Kaiapoi as "unmusical". Historian Harry Evison suggests Stack was strongly influenced by Tāmihana Te Rauparaha, with whom he spent a lot of time, including a ship voyage from London.

== See also ==
- History of Canterbury Region
- History of Ngāi Tahu
