= Peraki =

Coordinates: 43°51′30″S 172°49′27″E

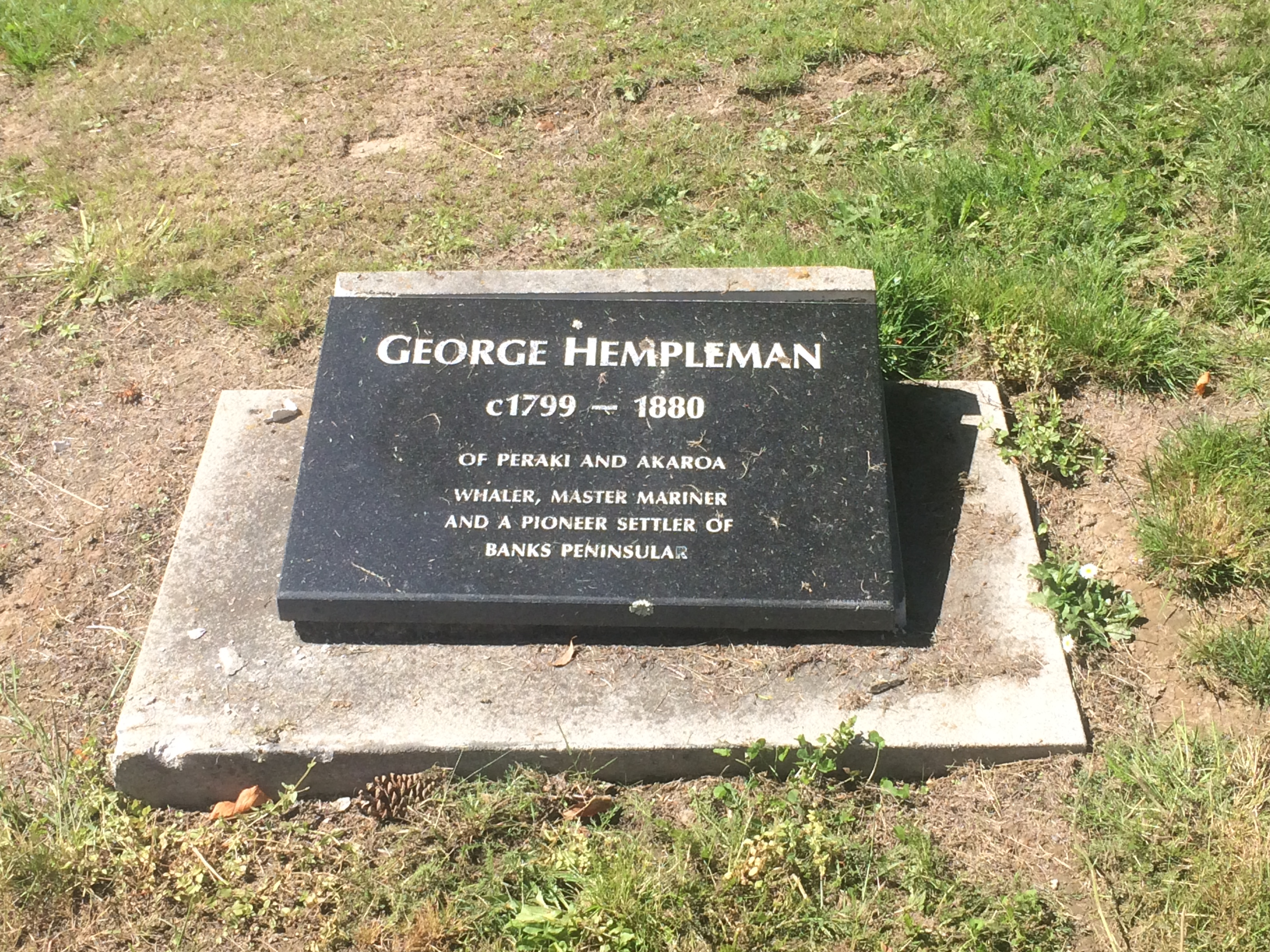
Grave of George Hempleman at Akaroa Cemetery

Peraki, a Māori language place name with an initial spelling of Pireka, is a bay on the south side of Banks Peninsula, New Zealand. It is the site of the first permanent European settlement in Canterbury. George Hempelman, a Prussian whaler, established a whaling station in the bay in 1835, and from 1837 lived there permanently. Peraki has a small cemetery, one of the earliest European cemeteries in New Zealand.

The Wairewa and Akaroa Counties paid for a memorial to Hempelman that was placed on Peraki Beach in March 1939. The memorial is made up of a whale try pot with the following inscription:

Erected to commemorate the centenary of the first white settler in Canterbury, New Zealand, Captain George Hempelman, who established a whaling station at Peraki in 1835.

Hempelman flew the German flag in front of his house, and in 1840 he was ordered by Captain Owen Stanley of HMS Britomart to take it down, with the Union Jack raised instead.
