= Hikuraki Bay =

Bay in New Zealand

Coordinates: 43.838°S 172.741°E

Hikuraki Bay is a small bay north of Magnet Bay and south of Tokoroa Bay in Canterbury, New Zealand, on the southern side of Banks Peninsula. Traces of early Moa Hunters' camps and burial sites have been found in the bay, their culture predating that of later Māori.

Oashore is a private coastal property, 550 hectares (1,400 acres) in area, that borders on Hikuraki Bay. It is primarily used for sheep farming. As of August 2015, the property was owned by American businessman Doug DeAngelis.
