= Takapūneke =

- former kāinga (unfortified Māori village)
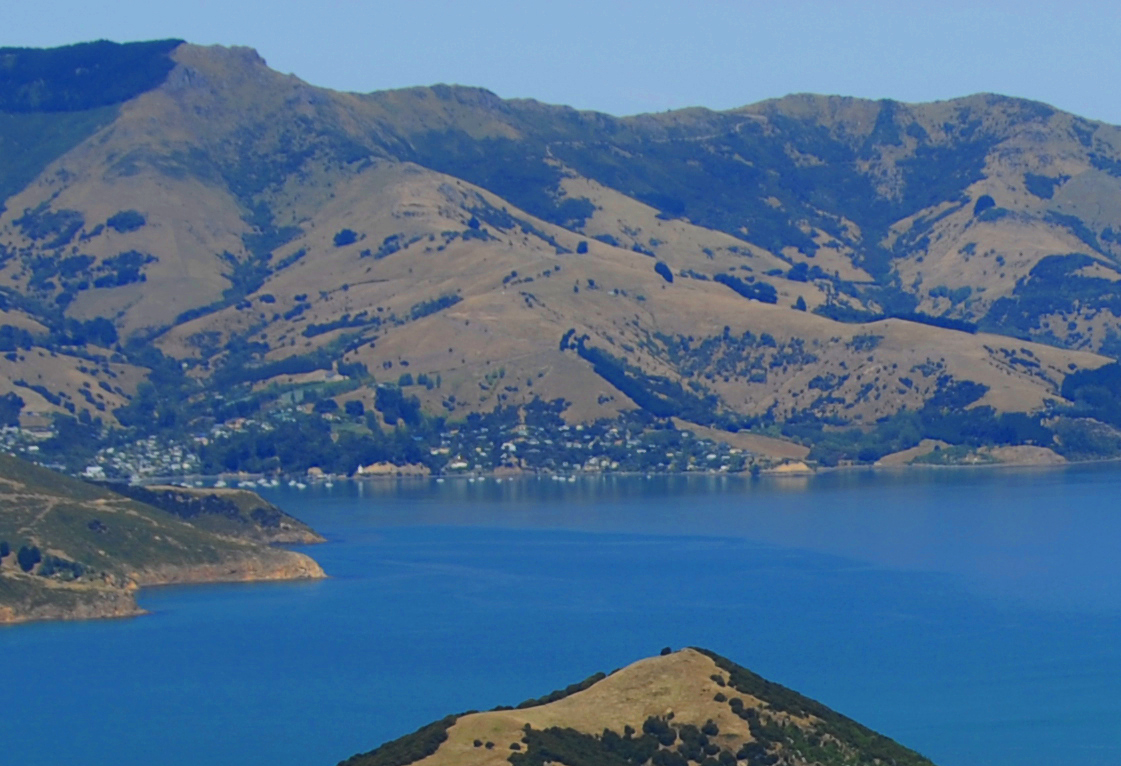
- Remote view of Takapūneke (to the right of Akaroa residences)

- Location within Banks Peninsula
- Coordinates: 43°49′6″S 172°56′54″E
- Country: New Zealand
- territorial authority: Christchurch City

Takapūneke, with the location also known as Red House Bay, is a former kāinga—an unfortified Māori village—adjacent to present-day Akaroa, New Zealand. Takapūneke was a major trading post for the local iwi (tribe), Ngāi Tahu, as there was safe anchorage for European vessels. The site is of significance to Ngāi Tahu as their tribal chief, Tama-i-hara-nui, was captured here by North Island Ngāti Toa chief Te Rauparaha, and then tortured and killed. The village itself was raided and subject of a massacre, with the events subsequently called the Elizabeth affair. There is a direct link from the massacre in 1830 to the signing of the Treaty of Waitangi in 1840, giving the site a status of national significance.

That significance has not always been widely known, and part of the site has been used as a landfill, with any artifacts of the core of the kāinga destroyed in 1960 through the construction of a sewage treatment plant. The site was declared sacred to Māori in 2002 by the New Zealand Historic Places Trust. Authorities have been working towards protecting the site and in 2018, Christchurch City Council adopted a management plan and subsequently made a formal request to the Minister of Conservation to apply for national reserve status. The sewage treatment plant is about to be relocated away from this site.

== History ==
The meaning of the Māori word Takapūneke is "a bay to drag in a fishing net". It was often used as the base by Tama-i-hara-nui, at the time the paramount chief of Ngāi Tahu. A large area of land surrounding the settlement was cultivated. The kāinga was a base for trade with Europeans as this was easily done in this location. Much of the trade was in food, timber and flax fibre (harakeke); the latter was collected from the area around Akaroa Harbour. Ngāi Tahu had got into conflict with Ngāti Toa in 1828 and an unequal war was being fought as Ngāti Toa had firearms but Ngāi Tahu had very few. Eight of Te Rauparaha's chiefs were killed after they had entered Kaiapoi Pā under the pretence of trade. Te Rauparaha, who had remained outside Kaiapoi Pā, returned to his base on Kapiti Island.

Two years later, in November 1830, Te Rauparaha returned on the brig Elizabeth under Captain John Stewart; the captain had been promised a cargo of flax in return for transporting a 100-strong Ngāti Toa war party. They anchored off Takapūneke and when Tama-i-hara-nui returned from collecting flax on 6 November, Captain Stewart enticed him and his family to come on board to trade flax for guns. Once on board, the concealed Ngāti Toa overwhelmed Tama-i-hara-nui, his wife and his daughter. That night, they then raided Takapūneke and either killed or enslaved those who were present. Different sources give different numbers for the casualties; a 2010 press release by Christchurch City Council states that 150 people were killed (which is a lower number than most other sources give). On Kapiti Island, Tama-i-hara-nui was handed to some of the wives of the eight chiefs killed at Kaiapoi Pā, who tortured him to death.

The attack led to Takapūneke being abandoned. The survivors either went to the pā (a fortified Māori village) on Ōnawe Peninsula or to the nearby Ōnuku. The next user of the land was William Barnard Rhodes, who in 1839 built himself a house which he painted bright red; this gave the locality its European name of Red House Bay.

Captain Stewart was charged with murder and appeared before a Sydney court in May 1831 but was discharged without conviction over a variety of legal questions. In May 1832, the Colonial Office overruled the Sydney Crown Solicitor and provided legal arguments by which Captain Stewart could be tried, but the captain had left Sydney in October 1831 and had apparently died on the journey near Cape Horn.

The massacre at Takapūneke resulted in the Governor of New South Wales, Ralph Darling, appointing James Busby as the inaugural British Resident in New Zealand. There is a chain of events that eventually led to the 1840 signing of the Treaty of Waitangi. Christchurch City Council's management plan for Takapūneke Reserve states:

Takapūneke is historically significant because there is a direct sequence of events at Takapūneke in 1830 and the acquisition of sovereignty over New Zealand by the British Government in 1840.

— Christchurch City Council staff,

== Later developments ==
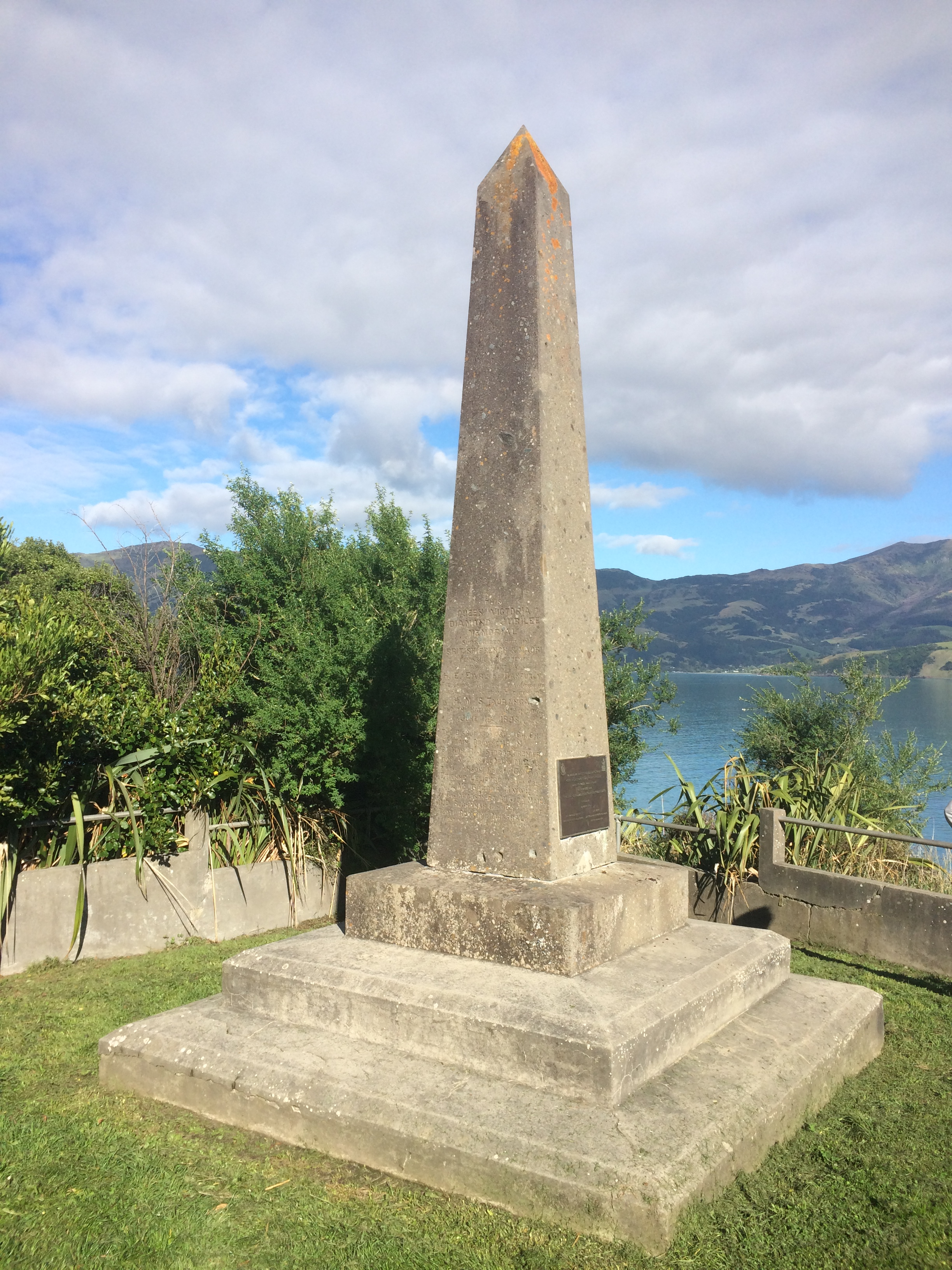
Monument commemorating the Britomart

Council records show that a sewage treatment plant was constructed at Takapūneke in 1960. In 1964, Akaroa County bought land from the western corner of Takapūneke Reserve where this plant had been built. The plant occupies the area that was the core of the kāinga. When it was built, many of the middens from Takapūneke were dug up. The council acknowledges that the construction of the plant in this location "was an act of particular cultural insensitivity". A landfill was located in one corner of the reserve; the landfill was capped in 1999. In 1992, a residential development was discussed for the land. After the Ōnuku rūnanga (a tribal council) raised concerns in 1995 about inappropriate uses of the reserve, an agreement was signed between the rūnanga and Banks Peninsula District in 1998.

On 30 May 2002, the New Zealand Historic Places Trust (now Heritage New Zealand) declared Takapūneke a Wahi Tapu Area, a place or site sacred to Māori; the list number of the site is 7521. Shortly before amalgamation with Christchurch City Council in March 2006, the Banks Peninsula District Council resolved to apply for National Reserve status, for which it is necessary to develop a management plan. In 2009, the Minister of Conservation, Tim Groser, changed the classification for the three land parcels that form Takapūneke Reserve to Historic Reserve to reflect the location's significance to Ngāi Tahu. Christchurch City Council adopted a management plan on 7 June 2018. The city council subsequently asked the Minister of Conservation to declare Takapūneke Reserve a national reserve.

== Proposed development ==
Takapūneke is approximately 1.8 kilometres (1.1 mi) south-west of the centre of Akaroa. There are three land parcels that form the historic area, with Britomart Historic Reserve itself not proposed to be included:

- Green’s Point (4.0611 ha), where the British flag was raised in 1840 to claim sovereignty ahead of the French; this is the site of the Britomart Monument, unveiled in 1898
- Beach Road Park (0.1741 ha)
- Takapūneke Reserve (9.6087 ha)

There is one building on the reserve, the Immigration Barracks relocated to here in 1898, and it is proposed to be kept. The reserve surrounds a privately held section where the red house used to stand and the city council has had a longstanding desire to buy this property if it came up for sale. The property was purchased in December 2020 for twice its ratable value. The capped landfill, which provides a level site, is proposed to be turned into a car park for visitors.

In 2015, Christchurch City Council obtained consent for a new wastewater treatment plant just north of Akaroa (Takapūneke is south of Akaroa). The discharge consent for the existing plant expires in October 2020 and the proposed plant does not have a discharge consent yet. Further consultation on options was to start in "early 2020" but as of May 2020, this is yet to happen.
