= Tama-i-hara-nui =

Ngai Tahu leader

Tama-i-hara-nui (17?? – c. 1830/1831) or Tamaiharanui, also known as Te Maiharanui, was a New Zealand Māori chief of Ngāi Tahu and its Ngāti Rakiāmoa hapū. He was "strong and ruthless" and was a central figure in the 1820s Kai Huānga ("eat relatives") feud within Ngāi Tahu.

Tama-i-hara-nui angered Ngāti Toa in about 1828 by letting a group of their chiefs into Kaiapoi pā and then killing them. Te Rauparaha, one of the Ngāti Toa chiefs who stayed outside of the pā, returned to Canterbury with a war party on board the ship Elizabeth in November 1830. The ship anchored off Takapūneke village in Akaroa Harbour with the war party hidden. Tama-i-hara-nui was enticed on board with his wife and daughter and they were taken prisoner. He was taken to Ōtaki, where the widows of the chiefs who had been killed at Kaiapoi pā tortured him, and he was killed.

== See also ==
- History of Canterbury Region: Attacks from the north
