= Pōhatu Marine Reserve =

Marine reserve in New Zealand territorial waters

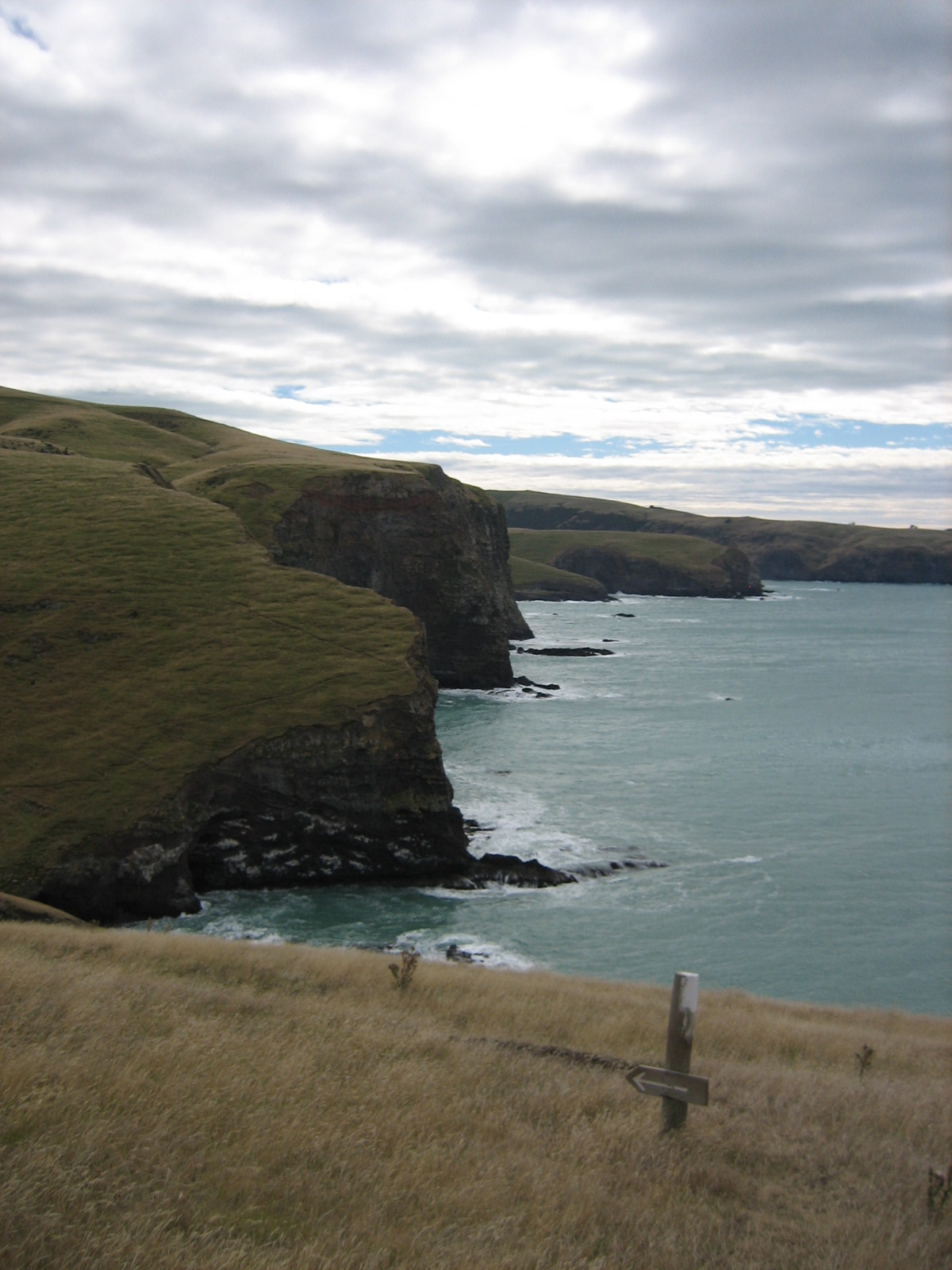
- Banks Peninsula Track between Pōhatu and Stony Bay

- Location within Banks Peninsula
- Location: Banks Peninsula, New Zealand
- Nearest city: Christchurch
- Coordinates: 43°52′42″S 173°01′10″E
- Area: 215.3 ha (532 acres)
- Established: 1999
- Governing body: Department of Conservation
- Website: www.pohatu.co.nz

Pōhatu Marine Reserve is a 215 ha (530 acres) marine reserve centred on Pōhatu / Flea Bay and lies between Ounu-hau Point and Redcliffe Point on Banks Peninsula in the Canterbury region of New Zealand. It was formally notified in 1999 and is administered by the Department of Conservation (DOC).

== Naming ==
Pōhatu Marine Reserve is often referred to as Flea Bay Marine Reserve. Pōhatu is the traditional name the bay, which translates as 'place of stones' or 'struck by a stone'. European settlers called it Flea Bay, likely due to the number of fleas in the sand, brought in by their cattle and pigs, making it difficult for visitors camping there to get a good night's sleep. It is arguable whether the name should be Flea Bay or Flee Bay. The family of Israel and Martha Rhodes, who farmed the area in the 1840s, suggest the spelling should be Flee Bay, as in a remote refuge for boats to flee to. This is corroborate an HMS Acheron (1838) survey chart that names the bay Boat Shelter Cove.

The bay’s official name is a dual name: Pōhatu / Flea Bay.

== Geography and ecology ==
The marine reserve covers the entire bay, and extends from its entrance along the coast from Damons Bay (Mangarohotu) to Strong Bay (Ōpatoti). The reserve typifies the diverse coastal landscape of Banks Peninsula, featuring high cliffs, rocky reefs and sandy beaches, all of which support rich marine communities. Cliffs several hundred meters high protect the bay from winds and swells, except in southerly conditions. The bottom is sand and the holding poor. Visibility is good. The southerly current that runs up the Canterbury Bight brings nutrients. Marine species such as hector's dolphin (Cephalorhynchus hectori), dusky dolphin (Lagenorhynchus obscurus) and kekono (New Zealand fur seal, Arctocephalus forsteri) feed in these waters.

In the intertidal zone, kelp-covered reefs provide a habitat for various species, including pāua, mussels, kina, limpets, sea tulips, crabs and crayfish. Fish species include blue cod (Parapercis colias), blue moki (Latridopsis ciliaris), tarakihi (Nemadactylus macropterus), sea perch (Helicolenus percoides), trumpeter (Latris lineata) and red cod (Pseudophycis bachus).

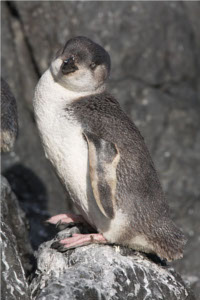
Penguin on a rock at Pōhatu

The beach at the head of the bay is surrounded by private land. Kororā (little blue penguin) and hoiho (yellow eyed penguin) nest there. The penguin colony, managed by the Helps family who owns the land, is the largest colony on Banks Peninsula. The Helps family carry out predator control and population assessments, with support from the Department of Conservation and volunteers. Shireen and Francis Helps received an NZ Order of Merit (June 2021) for conservation work protecting the penguins. The couple fought for the creation of marine reserve in the waters that lap their property’s edge, in part because the reserve would put a stop to recreational fishers setting nets across the penguin runs overnight.

== History ==
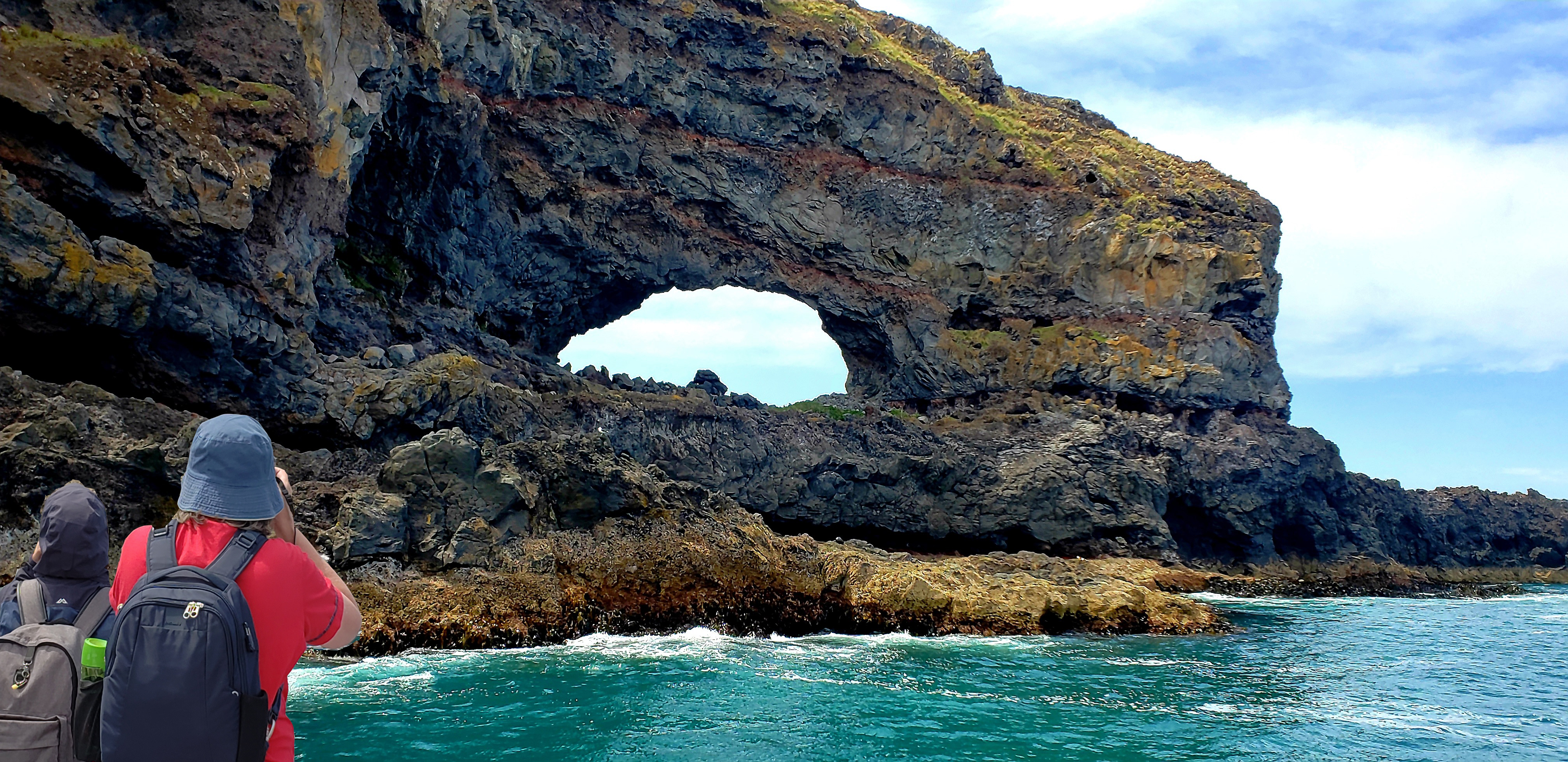
Hole in rock near Haylocks Bay (between Pōhatu and the Akaroa Heads)

The process to establish the Pōhatu Marine Reserve was very contentious. It is located 1.62 nautical miles (3.00 km; 1.86 mi) from the Akaroa Marine Reserve and Akaroa Tāiapure. Its history overlaps not only the larger reserve and the tāiapure.

A Kāti Māmoe pā (fortified Māori village) once stood here. Ōnuku Marae is the closest marae to the reserve. In 1996, the Akaroa Harbour Marine Protection Society applied for a 530 hectares (1,300 acres) marine reserve south of Ōnuku Marae within Akaroa Harbour. Recreational fishers, commercial fishers and local runanga all objected to this site. Te Rūnanga o Koukourārata claimed customary fishing interests in those waters, and countered with a proposal to establish a tāiapure over the whole harbour.

Fishers responded by suggesting a smaller reserve at Pōhatu / Flea Bay, situated outside of Akaroa Harbour. Consequently, the Pōhatu reserve was chosen due to its less controversial nature. It was formally established in 1999. It was the first marine reserve for Canterbury, and indeed for the east coast of the South Island. DOC also purchased land from a nearby farmer to create a land reserve.

The runanga backed the Pōhatu site; however, they remained resolute in their pursuit of the tāiapure, while some families continue to fish in the reserve, believing it to be a customary fishing ground. The Pōhatu marine reserve effectively halted the creation of the tāiapure for seven years and the Akaroa marine reserve for 15 years.

== Recreation ==
The reserve is accessible by foot, kayak, boat and four-wheel drive vehicle. Low tide is the best time to visit. Dogs are not permitted. The protected marine life can be viewed by diving or snorkelling.

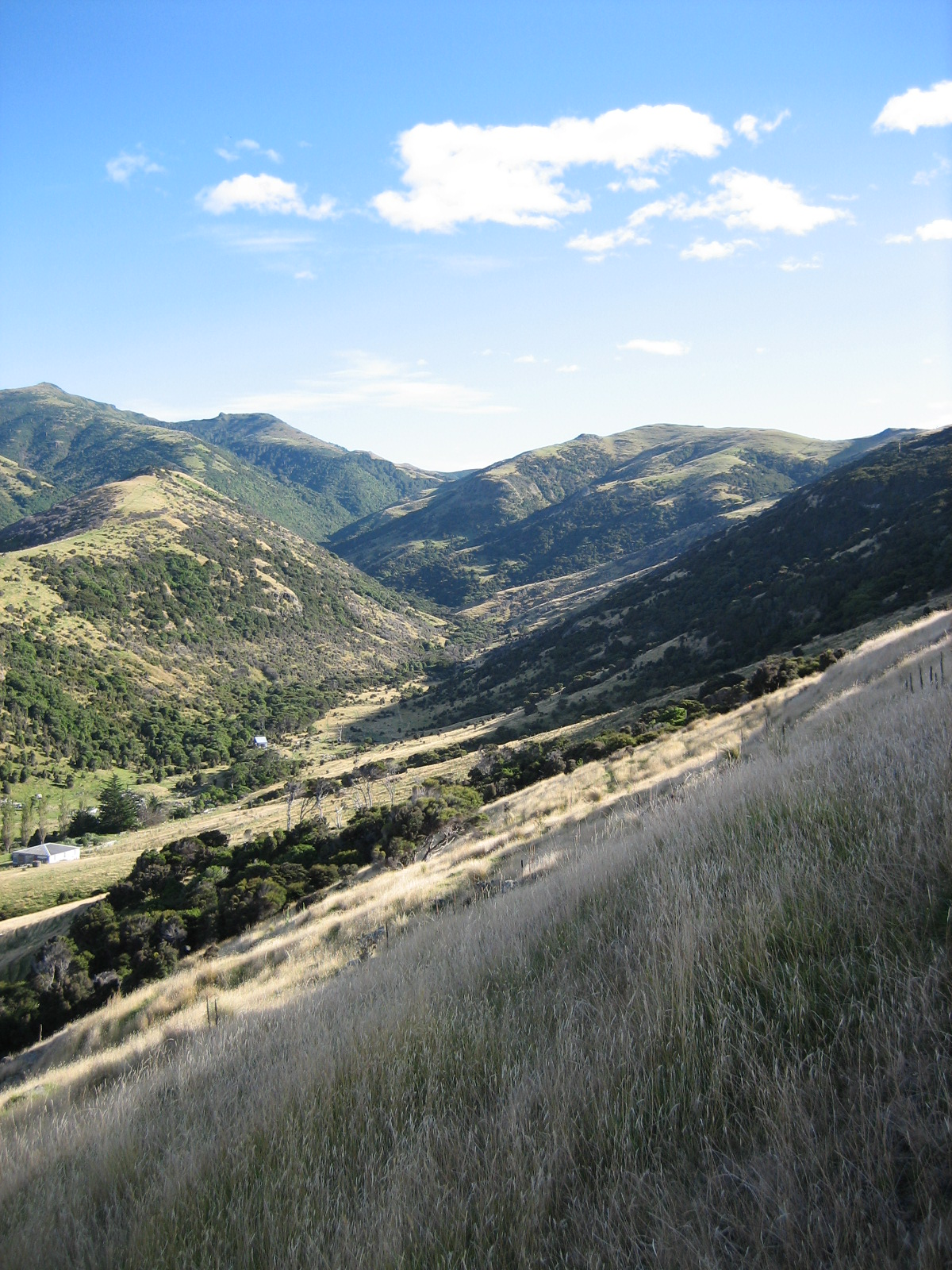
This land is steep

This is a no-take zone. DOC rangers do routine boat patrols. There is a ban on fishing, and taking, killing or moving marine life and materials, including rocks or driftwood. However, members of Ōnuku runanga are permitted to take pāua. Permission was granted by the Minister of Conservation, in 2008, after a survey of shellfish indicated the runanga’s request would not be detrimental to the reserve.

To get there from land, take highway 75 to Akaroa. The reserve is 15 kilometres (9.3 mi) from Akaroa via a steep and unsealed road. Follow the Lighthouse Road up to the Flea Bay Road turnoff.

Pōhatu / Flea Bay is one of the accommodation stops on the Banks Peninsula Track, a two or three-day tramp over private farmland.

== Outcomes ==
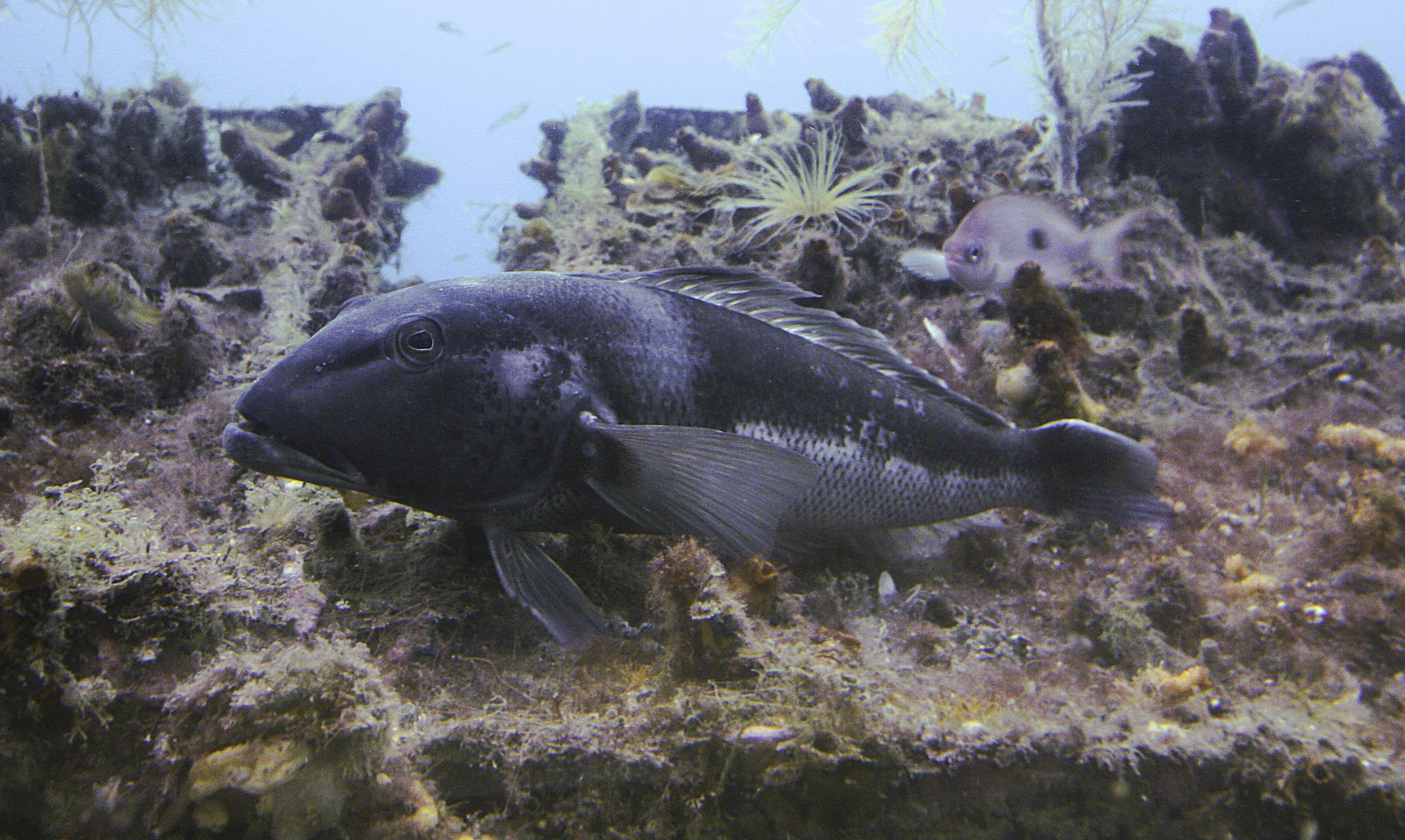
Blue cod

Baseline surveys by Davidson & Abel in 2001 and 2002 assessed fish and invertebrate abundance, size, and species richness at the reserve. The 2001 survey found ten reef fish species with no significant differences between reserve and control areas. The follow-up showed legal-sized blue cod (> 300 mm) were more common and slightly larger in the marine reserve than in control sites.

A further 2018 spanned 13 km of the southern Banks Peninsula coastline and included five ‘survey areas’: two no-take marine reserves (Akaroa Marine Reserve and Pōhatu Marine Reserve), two areas with Taiāpure protection (outer Akaroa Harbour control and Damon’s Bay control, and one area with no protection (Otanerito Bay control). 28 species of fish were observed in the reserve, compared with 10 in 2001. The biomass of legal-sized cod was 6.6 times greater inside the reserve than at control sites. Increased biomass and species richness are likely due to the protection from direct fishing pressure.

Pōhatu Marine Reserve is very small, so the impacts of edge effects and the low availability of habitat may be limiting the effectiveness of the reserve for increasing blue cod abundance (Roberts et al. 2001; Halpern & Warner 2003). Large blue cod are known to be particularly territorial (Willis et al. 2000) and the size structure of the population at POHMR was clearly different from that in the control areas (see below). Therefore, if large fish are forcing juvenile recruits out of Pōhatu Marine Reserve, the abundance of fish may be limited. Also, fisher non-compliance will influence blue cod abundance within the reserve to some degree – seven boats were caught poaching in the reserves at Banks Peninsula over 2 months in summer 2017/18 (T. MacTavish, pers. obs.)

— Tom Brough et al. in Biological monitoring of marine protected areas at Banks Peninsula using baited underwater video (BUV) page 20

The penguin colony is an established eco-tourism destination. The population of breeding penguins went from 700 to more than 1200 nests in 18 years, despite a decline in numbers attributed to severe weather events (El Niño occurring for two consecutive years) and invasions by aerial predators like the Giant Petrel (Macronectes).

== See also ==
- Marine reserves of New Zealand
