= Pōhatu / Flea Bay =

Bay on Banks Peninsular, New Zealand

- Bay
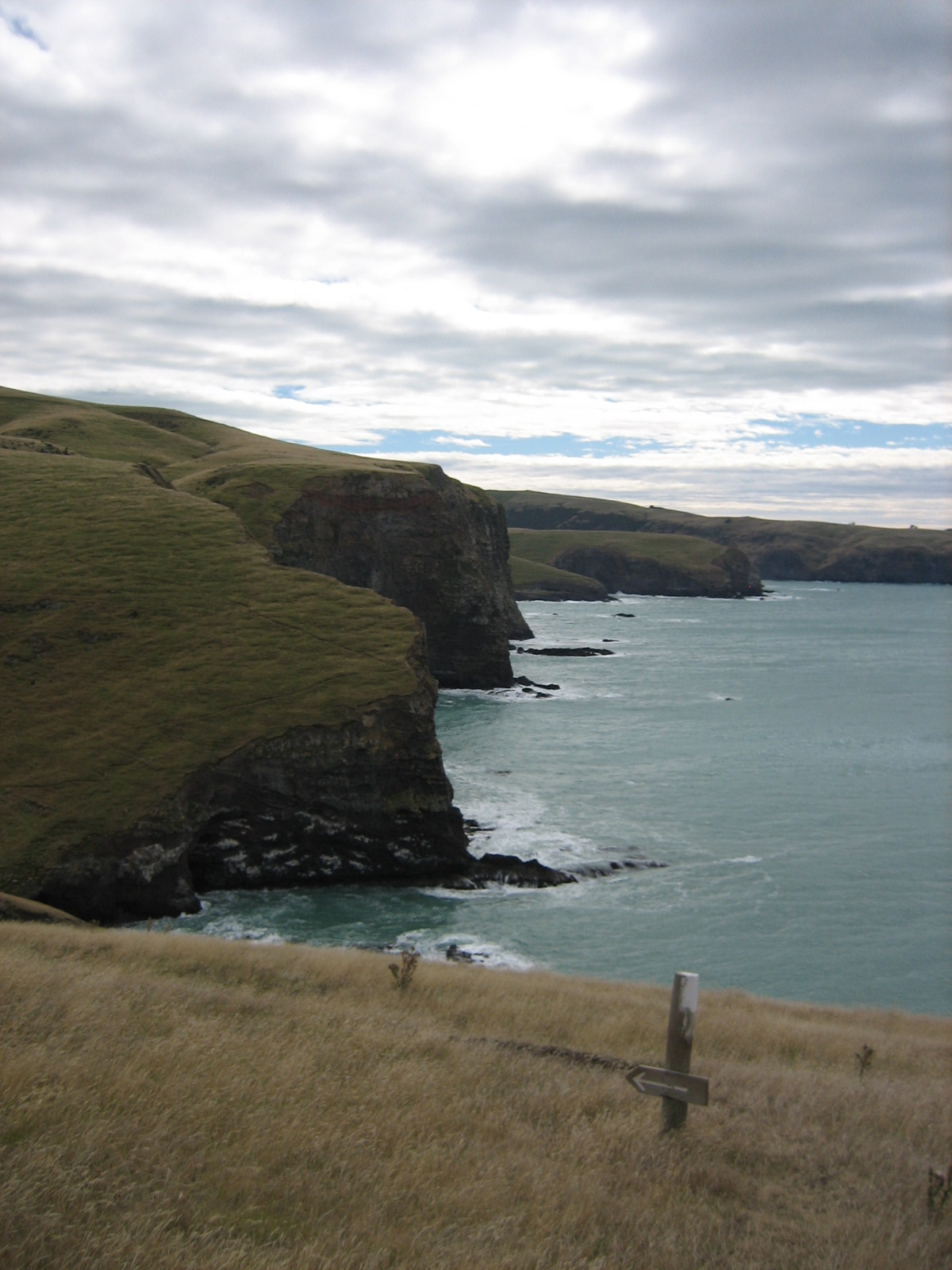
- Banks Peninsula Track between Pōhatu / Flea Bay and Stony Bay
- Interactive map of Pōhatu / Flea Bay
- Coordinates: 43.87449°S 173.01231°E
- Formed by: Volcanic, sea and rain action
- Volcanic field: Banks Peninsula Volcano

Pōhatu / Flea Bay is a bay located approximately 2.7 nautical miles (5.0 km; 3.1 mi) east-northeast of the entrance to Akaroa Harbour in New Zealand. It is home to the largest penguin colony on Banks Peninsula and the Pōhatu Marine Reserve. The marine reserve is habitat for many fish species including moki, butterfish, guppy, banded wrasse, blue cod, leather jackets, lobsters, pāua and rockfish.

A Kāti Māmoe pā (fortified Māori village) once stood here. Pōhatu translates as 'place of stones' or 'struck by a stone'. The bay, shaped by the forces of the sea, rainfall, and the Akaroa volcano, measures approximately 1.08 nautical miles (2.00 km; 1.24 mi) in length and 0.27 nautical miles (0.50 km; 0.31 mi) in width.

Dyke Head, at the southern entrance to the bay, typifies the coastal landscape of Banks Peninsula, with a protruding reef, offshore rocks and eroded sea stacks.
