= Akaroa Marine Reserve =

Marine reserve in Akaroa Harbour, New Zealand

- IUCN category Ia (strict nature reserve)
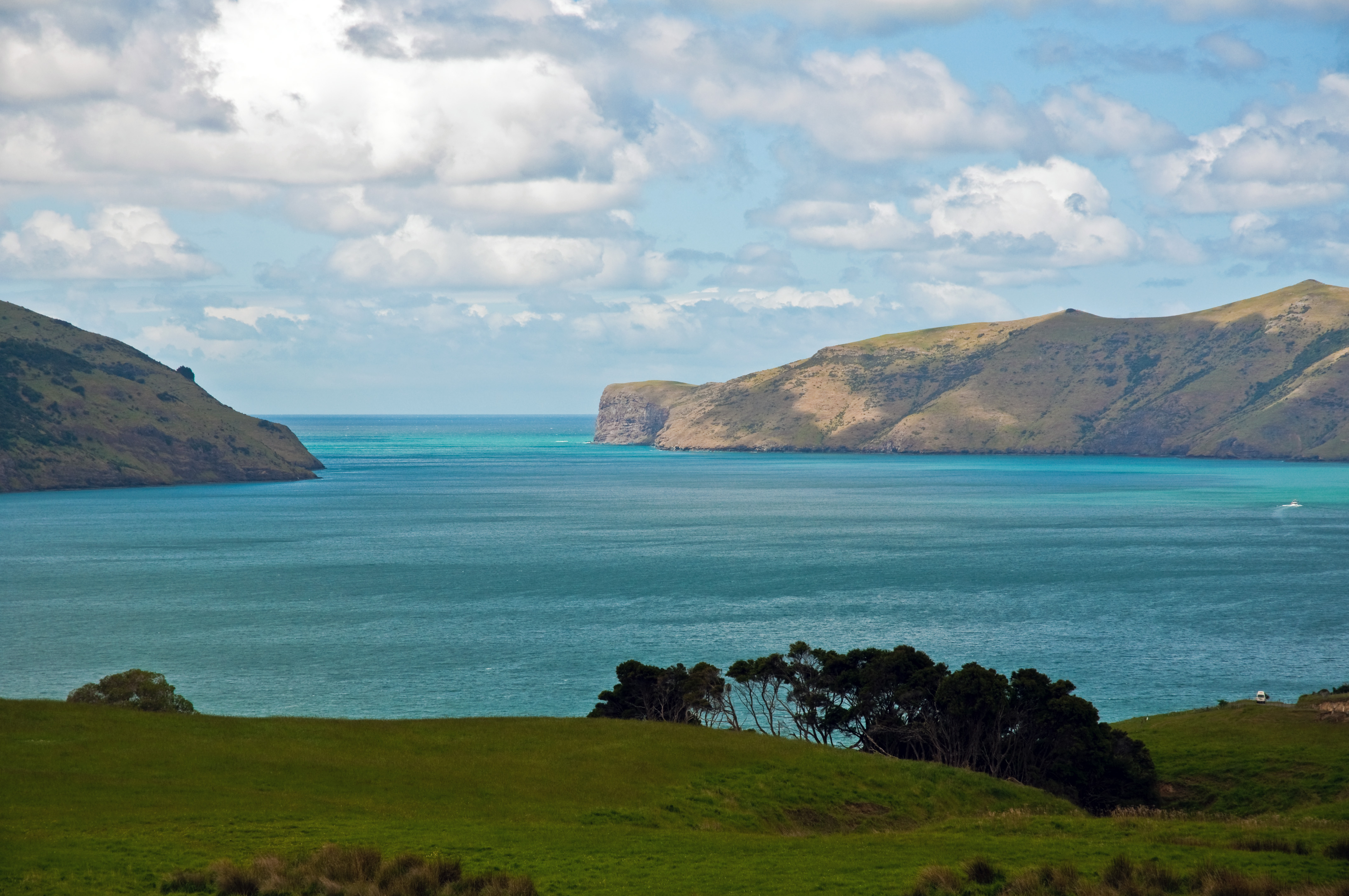
- The entrance of Akaroa Harbour in 2010. The reserve is in an area on the left side of the entrance.
- Interactive map of Akaroa Marine Reserve
- Location: New Zealand
- Nearest city: Christchurch
- Coordinates: 43.882367°S 172.965131°E
- Area: 512 ha (1,270 acres)
- Established: 2014

Akaroa Marine Reserve is a no-take marine protected area covering 512.15 hectares (1,265.6 acres) at the entrance to Akaroa Harbour in New Zealand. The marine reserve was approved in 2013 after a lengthy campaign, and established in 2014. The adjacent Akaroa Taiāpure occupies the rest of the harbour and was established earlier.

== Marine reserve and taiāpure ==
Akaroa Marine Reserve and the nearby Pōhatu Marine Reserve are no-take zones. The harbour as a whole has considerable natural values, and the fauna of the inner and outer harbour differs. There are pressures on the ecology from human activity, such as settlements on the edge of the harbour, and land and water-based industrial activity. The marine boundary of Akaroa Marine Reserve is almost entirely surrounded by Akaroa Taiāpure, which occupies the rest of the harbour and the ocean coast between the Akaroa and Pōhatu reserves.

The taiāpure is a local fishing co-management tool for the harbour, which has customarily been of special significance to the hapū as a source of food for spiritual and cultural reasons. The taiāpure was established over 90 percent of the harbour in February 2006. It allows Te Rūnanga o Ngāi Tahu (tribal council) and other fisheries stakeholders to have a say in how the harbour is managed. Fishing can continue in taiāpure, subject to rules and regulations.

The taiāpure complements the reserve (the remaining 10% of the harbour), as does Pōhatu Marine Reserve just outside the harbour entrance, in Pōhatu / Flea Bay, plus Lyttelton Harbour's Port Levy Mātaitai Reserve and Rāpaki Mātaitai Reserve. A mātaitai is a permanent reserve created in areas of traditional importance to Māori for customary food gathering.

The two marine reserves are total no-take areas, whereas the taiāpure and mātaitai are fishing enabling and not about the protection of marine life. Indeed, the tangata tiaki (marine guardian) has the power to override fishing regulations, and moreover, the taking of kelp by one pāua farmer is enshrined in the taiāpure legislation. The Akaroa Taiāpure Management Committee is a non-elected group largely made up of Ngāi Tahu representatives and a range of fisheries interest groups, including recreational, commercial, marine farmers and marine tourism operators. This committee has no control over the number of recreational anglers, hence no control over the total number of fish and shellfish taken.

== History ==
Throughout the 1980s and 1990s, people with local knowledge knew that fish stocks were nowhere near as plentiful as they once were. Māori who had fished the harbour for decades had lost the opportunity of fishing freely along its shoreline. The rūnanga (committee of senior decision-makers of an iwi (tribal group) or hapū (family, district groups or community)) knew that pollution and over-fishing had diminished the area of available mahinga kai (traditional food gathering areas) within the harbour. Pollution includes sewage, farm and sub-division run-off as well as algal blooms.

Forest and Bird carried out exploratory dives in Akaroa Harbour in 1990. The Akaroa Harbour Marine Protection Society formally proposed the establishment of a 560-hectare (1,400-acre) marine reserve in 1996. The proposal was divisive and led to a two-decade battle that pitted a small group of vocal and determined local residents and divers against recreational anglers, rūnanga, commercial fishers and one aquaculturalist.

The local residents wanted a no-take area in the eastern waters of the outer harbour to acts as a breeding pool and as place for dolphins to feed. Recreational anglers argued "that's where we fish in a northeasterly". Te Runanga o Ngāi Tahu claimed strong ties to the area, naming it Te Whata o Kōkiro (meaning the food store-house of Kokiro). When the marine reserve idea was first mooted, commercial fishing was a part of Akaroa's economy and commercial fishers strongly opposed it. During the long battle, fish stock declined, and so did commercial fishing.

The original proposal called for a reserve within the harbour. Fishers counteracted that proposal by applying for and getting a smaller 215 hectares (530 acres) hectares reserve to be located outside of the harbour, at sheltered bay named Pōhatu / Flea Bay.

While eco-tourism operators were pleased to have something to show to tourists, local iwi continued to express concerns that marine reserves hindered their traditional rights to harvest from the sea. Meanwhile, the local residents group continued to advocate for a reserve within the harbour.

Eventually, a compromise was reached. The rūnanga applied to establish a taiāpure (fisheries co-management by local people) over 90% of the harbour, and supported a marine reserve over 10%, but not before both were further held up by a pāua (abalone) farmer negotiating for the right for him to harvest seaweed be enshrined in the taiāpure.

The Fisheries Act 1996 Part 9 Section 174–175 provides for the establishment of taiāpure/fisheries co-management by local people who care about and have strong ties to an area. In January 2004, the Māori Land Court tribunal made a recommendation to the Minister of Fisheries that a taiāpure be granted over the whole of Akaroa Harbour bar one small area subject to the, at that time, proposed Akaroa Marine Reserve. Judge Wainwright saw no reason why the two could not live together. However, this recommendation was successfully appealed by the local pāua farmer and kelp harvester, who claimed a taiāpure would compromise his business. The High Court sent the case back to the tribunal to gather further evidence about whether the whole of Akaroa Harbour does or does not come within the concept of "littoral coastal waters" of "special cultural significance" to the rūnanga.

The pāua farmer eventually reached an understanding with Ngāi Tahu, ending years of argument. He has been granted the rights to harvest giant bladder kelp (Macrocystis pyrifera), which he uses to feed the pāua at the Akaroa Paua Farm and also to make garden fertiliser and kelp pepper. In contrast, the East Otago Taiāpure explicitly prohibits the harvesting of kelp. That ban does not extend to unattached beach-cast kelp. There are environmental concerns in Akaroa Harbour regarding the ecological disruption caused by kelp harvesting to wild pāua and other kaimoana (sea food).

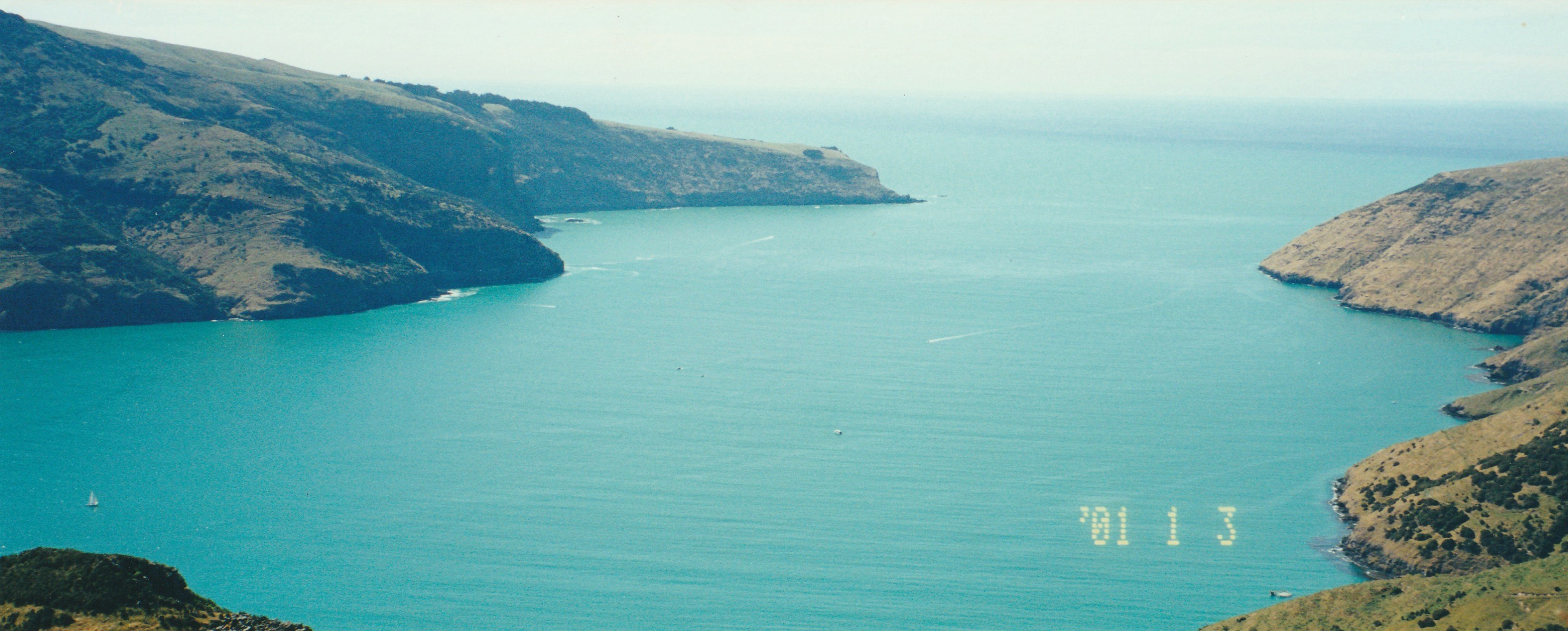
Entrance of Akaroa Harbour in 2001. The reserve is on the left side of the entrance, and a pāua farm on the right.

The taiāpure was established in February 2006, but the marine reserve took eight more years.

Conservation Minister Kate Wilkinson declined the application for the reserve in 2010 on the grounds that it would adversely affect recreational fishing. The decision was challenged in the High Court and was quashed in a 2012 ruling. In terms of actual numbers, the two separate consultation processes for the application had attracted more support than opposition.

In April 2013 Conservation Minister Nick Smith announced the approval of the reserve but at the reduced size of 465 hectares (1,150 acres). Smith believed the battle had gone on for too long. The size was reduced to take into account the concerns about customary and recreational fishing. Subsequently, the size was finalised as 512 hectares (1,270 acres). Environment Minister Amy Adams expressed an aspiration for the next step to be integrating the local management of taiāpure and reserve so the two mechanisms work together.

== Fishing ==
New Zealand fishing rules place reduced bag limits on many fish species and prohibit shellfish gathering in specific areas. Tangata tiaki (marine guardians) are appointed for Ōnuku Runanga rōhe moana (defined customary fishing area) by the Minister of Primary Industries. The tangata tiaki (also known as kaitiaki) receive training in bylaws, what quantities of various species can be taken, dates or seasons recommended for harvest, size limits and methods of harvest.

Fishers can get a kaitiaki permit from the tangata tiaki granting permission to take over and above the catch limit, and under the legal size. This permit, colloquially called a "chit", is given for tangihanga (funeral), hui (gathering) and other occasions. In addition to upping catch limits, the kaitiaki has the power to override other fishing regulations. For example, under the recreational fishing rules, no person may take pāua using scuba (underwater breathing apparatus) and there is a ban on set netting in the harbour to protect endangered Hector's dolphins, however, the tangata tiaki can permit the use of scuba gear and set nets, as well as allow fishing in closed areas, such as in the marine reserves.

== Outcomes ==
In 2018, the Department of Conservation trialled a baited underwater video study, which provided a snapshot of the fish communities both within and outside the Akaroa and Pōhatu marine reserves. A total of 28 fish species were identified, demonstrating that the baited underwater video technique is an effective method for examining the size and relative abundance of these species. The study found notable differences in the relative abundances and sizes of blue cod and blue moki in the marine reserves when compared to three taiāpure control areas. However, since there is no baseline data for Akaroa Marine Reserve, it would be hasty to link these spatial variations to their protection status. Nonetheless, the results indicated an increase in the abundance and size of blue cod and moki at Pōhatu reserve compared to earlier studies, and that is likely due to the protection from direct fishing pressure.

In 2021, a three-year initiative called Iongairo was launched to supply data that aids in the management of customary fishing zones and enhances understanding of marine reserves in Te Pātaka o Rākaihautū/Banks Peninsula. Iongairo focused on identifying and evaluating important habitats—including rock, sand, and mud—and key species such as pāua, mussels, and various types of seaweed. Additionally, it examined the effects of human activities on the environment. Methods included baited underwater cameras, towed and dropped cameras, along with sediment grabs. The outcome is an interactive online map showcasing the seafloor.

== See also ==
- Marine reserves of New Zealand
