= Takamatua =

Town in Canterbury, New Zealand

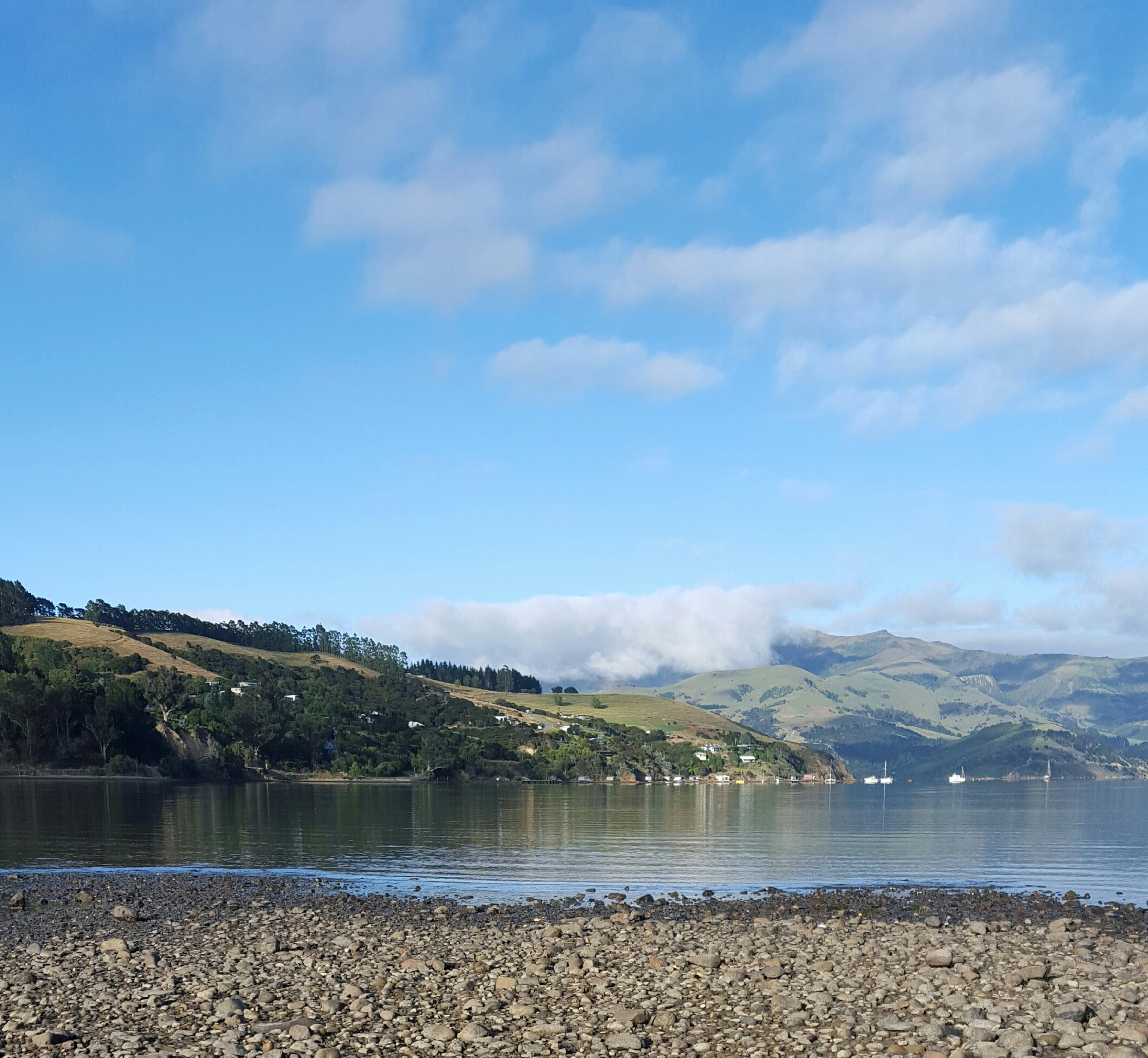
- Takamatua Bay
- Interactive map of Takamatua
- Coordinates: 43°47′0″S 172°58′15″E
- Country: New Zealand
- Region: Canterbury Region
- District: Christchurch City
- Ward: Banks Peninsula
- Community: Te Pātaka o Rākaihautū Banks Peninsula
- Electorates: Banks Peninsula; Te Tai Tonga (Māori)

Government
  - Territorial Authority: Christchurch City Council
  - Regional council: Environment Canterbury
  - Mayor of Christchurch: Phil Mauger
  - Banks Peninsula MP: Vanessa Weenink
  - Te Tai Tonga MP: Tākuta Ferris

Area
  - Total: 6.30 km^{2} (2.43 sq mi)

Population (June 2025)
  - Total: 110
  - Density: 17/km^{2} (45/sq mi)
- Postcode: 7581

Takamatua, formerly known as German Bay, is a small town situated in Akaroa Harbour on Banks Peninsula in New Zealand. The main road to Akaroa (State Highway 75) passes through this locality. It is 3 kilometres (1.9 mi) north of Akaroa township.

== History ==
At the time of French settlement in August 1840 in Akaroa, a small number of German families settled in this bay. Five German men, four of them single, chose to have land in Takamatua rather than Akaroa. The men were Breitmeyer, Hahn, Hettich, Waeckerle, Walther and Woll. The bay was named German Bay up until 1916 when the residents called on the Minister for Internal Affairs, George Warren Russell, to change the name to Takamatua, as a patriotic reaction to World War I. The German Bay Dairy Co-operative Factory was established in 1893. The Factory's cheese won first prize at the Dunedin Agricultural Show in 1901 and 1902.

== Demographics ==
Takamatua is described by Stats NZ as a rural settlement, and covers 6.30 km^{2} (2.43 sq mi). It had an estimated population of 110 as of June 2025, with a population density of 17 people per km^{2}. It is part of the statistical area of Akaroa Harbour.

Historical population
Year	Pop.	±% p.a.
2006	111	—
2013	135	+2.84%
2018	111	−3.84%
2023	117	+1.06%

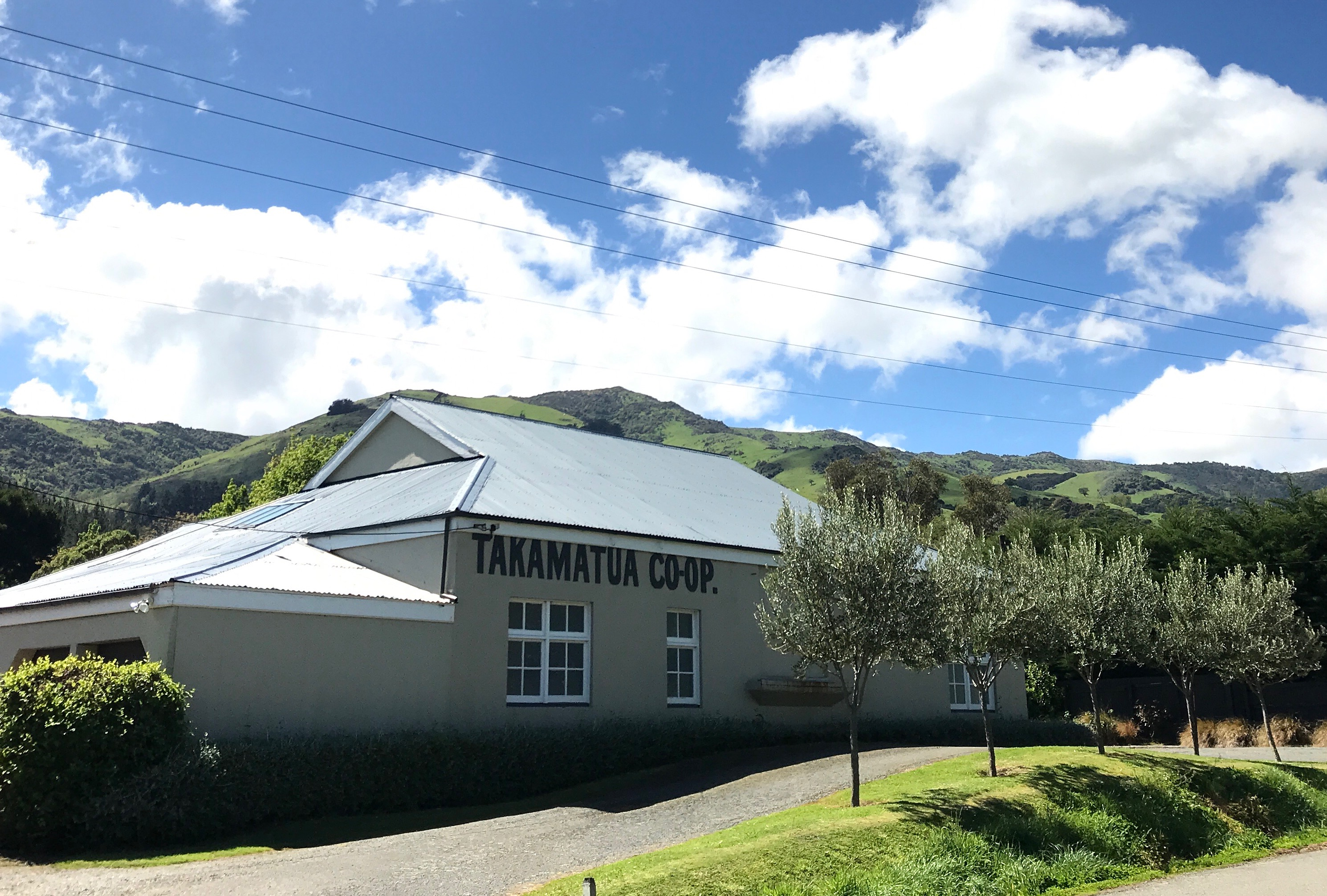
Takamatua Co-operative Dairy Factory on Takamatua Valley Road

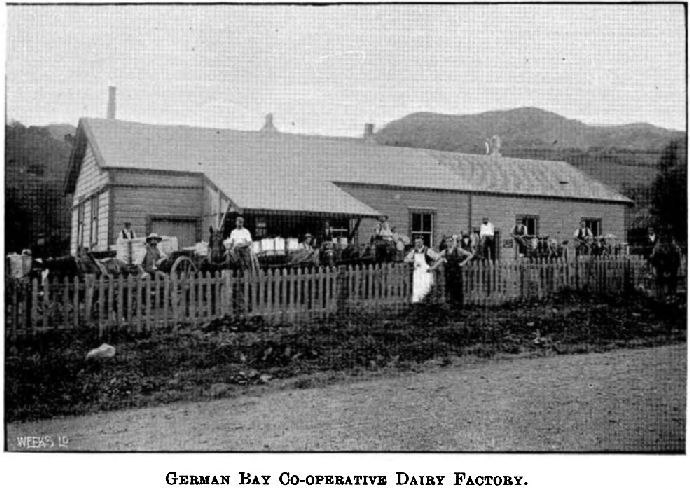
German Bay Co-operative Dairy Factory in 1903

Takamatua had a population of 117 in the 2023 New Zealand census, an increase of 6 people (5.4%) since the 2018 census, and a decrease of 18 people (−13.3%) since the 2013 census. There were 60 males, 54 females, and 3 people of other genders in 57 dwellings. 5.1% of people identified as LGBTIQ+. The median age was 66.1 years (compared with 38.1 years nationally). There were 6 people (5.1%) aged under 15 years, 12 (10.3%) aged 15 to 29, 33 (28.2%) aged 30 to 64, and 63 (53.8%) aged 65 or older.

People could identify as more than one ethnicity. The results were 94.9% European (Pākehā), 7.7% Māori, 2.6% Asian, and 5.1% other, which includes people giving their ethnicity as "New Zealander". English was spoken by 100.0%, and other languages by 2.6%. The percentage of people born overseas was 20.5, compared with 28.8% nationally.

Religious affiliations were 38.5% Christian, and 2.6% other religions. People who answered that they had no religion were 53.8%, and 5.1% of people did not answer the census question.

Of those at least 15 years old, 18 (16.2%) people had a bachelor's or higher degree, 60 (54.1%) had a post-high school certificate or diploma, and 27 (24.3%) people exclusively held high school qualifications. The median income was $40,700, compared with $41,500 nationally. 9 people (8.1%) earned over $100,000 compared to 12.1% nationally. The employment status of those at least 15 was 39 (35.1%) full-time, 30 (27.0%) part-time, and 3 (2.7%) unemployed.
