= Kāinga =

Unfortified Māori village

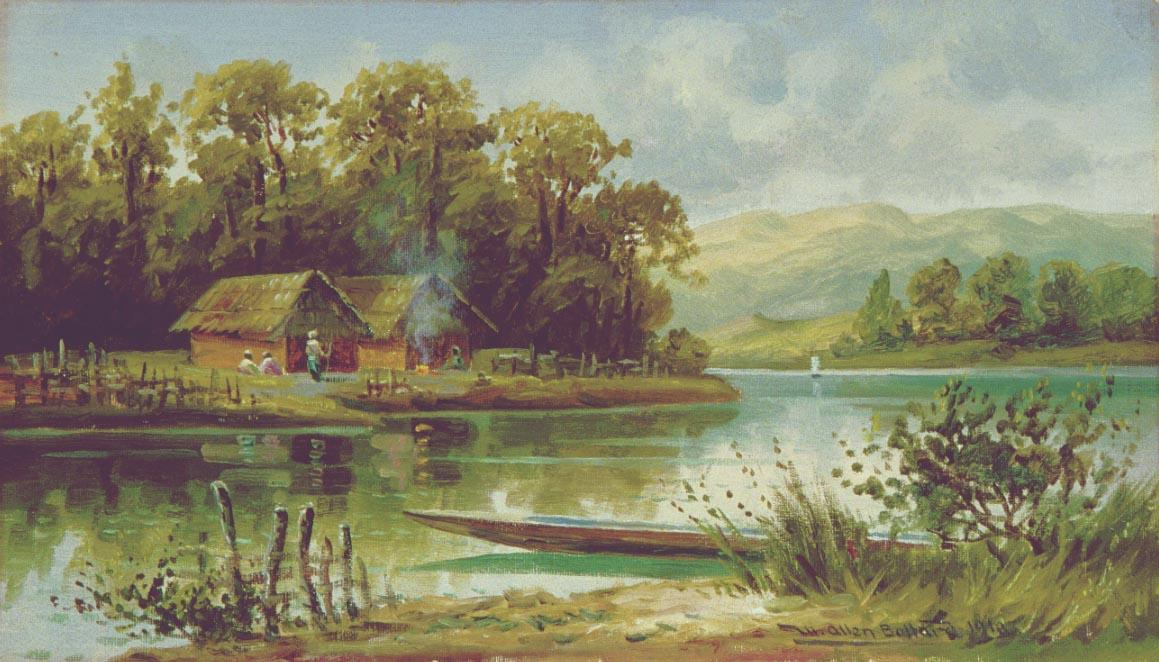
Painting of a kāinga beside the Waikato River

A kāinga (southern Māori: kaika or kaik) is the traditional form of village habitation of pre-European Māori in New Zealand. It was unfortified or only lightly fortified, and over time became less important than the well-fortified pā.

== Description ==
Kāinga were generally unfortified or only lightly fortified, as opposed to the well-defended pā. They were generally coastal, and often found near to a river mouth. The settlement was generally occupied by members of one hapū (sub-tribe), which would identify itself with the nearest mountain and river (even in modern Māori, when meeting someone new, "what is your mountain?" is not an unusual question, and naming a mountain and river is a standard part of a traditional introduction or pepeha).

Kāinga were often regarded as only semi-permanent settlements, and they were often abandoned. Reasons for abandonment included invasion by other iwi or resource shortages. Traditionally, Māori were often semi-nomadic, with entire communities moving at harvest or to hunt, using the kāinga as a stable home base. An entire settlement could be declared tapu on the death of a tribal elder, with its inhabitants moving to a new location nearby. Takapūneke near present-day Akaroa, for example, was subject to a massacre in 1830. Survivors mostly lived in nearby Ōnuku and Takapūneke having been declared a sacred site, it was avoided by the local hapū for over 100 years.

When European whalers arrived in New Zealand and established bases, kāinga would often shift to near the newcomers so that trading would be easier.

== Modern use of the word ==
In modern Māori, kāinga is the word for "home".

== See also ==
- Marae
