= Kaitiakitanga =

Māori concept of guardianship

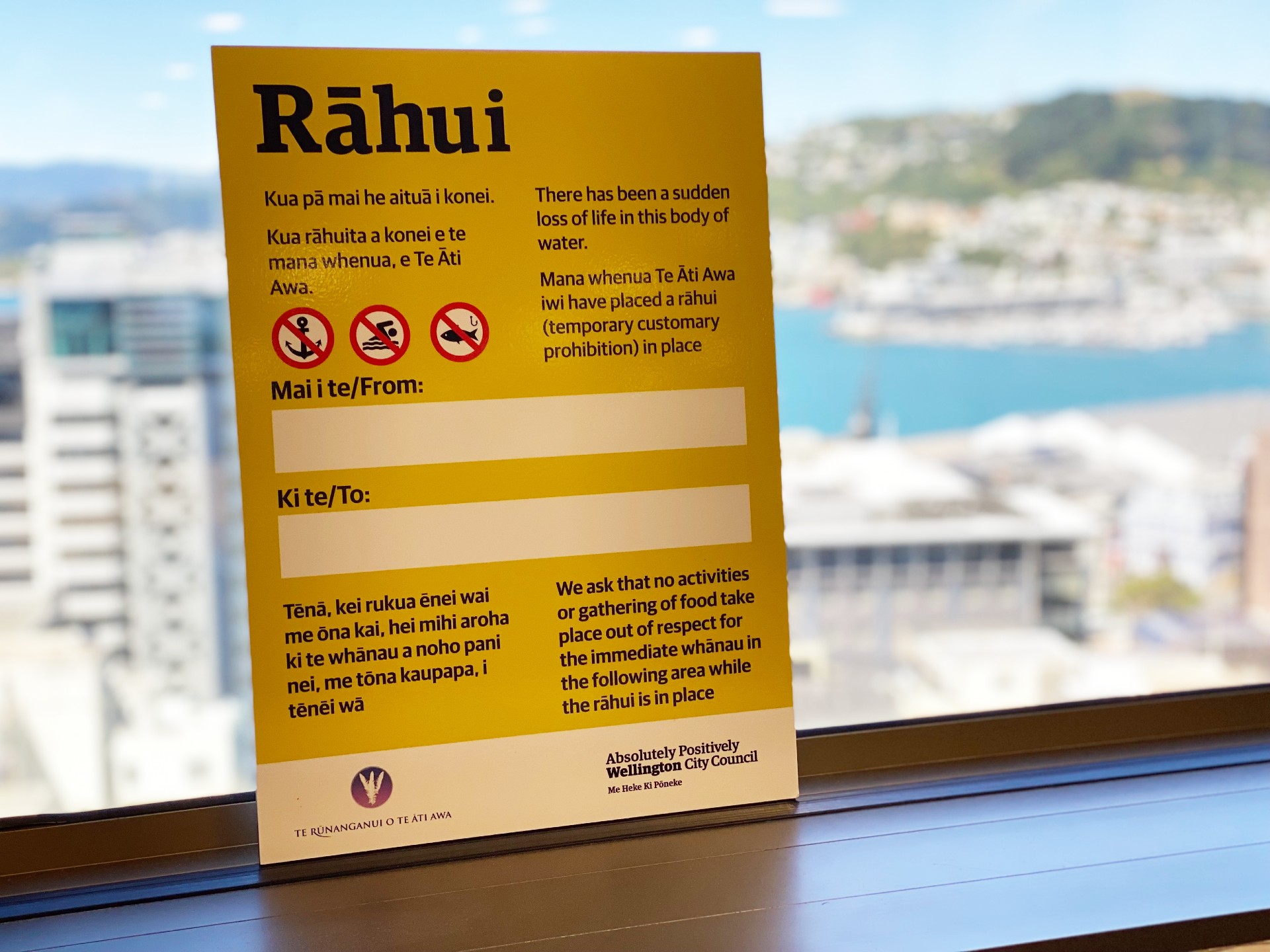
Sign used by Wellington City Council in collaboration with local mana whenua giving notice of a rāhui being in place

In the traditional Māori worldview, kaitiakitanga is the concept of guardianship of the natural environment. A kaitiaki is a guardian, and kaitiakitanga refers to the process and practices of protecting and looking after the environment. The concept and terminology has been increasingly brought into public policy, particularly relating to environmental and resource controls under the Resource Management Act.

== Traditional view ==
Kaitiakitanga exists as a responsibility emerging from the traditionally holistic Māori worldview to ensure that people act in a manner that ensures peace within the environment, one that provides a process for preventing intrusions that cause permanent imbalances and guard against environmental damage. In practice, kaitiakitanga is embedded with tikanga. It is a broad notion that includes the ideas of guardianship, care, and wise management.

In the traditional view, all Māori trace their ancestry (whakapapa) to the beginning of existence, the single entity that became Ranginui and Papatūānuku. This genealogy is a bond between humans and the rest of the physical world both "immutable and inseparable". Papatūānuku is embodied in the physical form of the earth and continues to provide sustenance for all. Accordingly, Māori read more into the interpretation of kaitiakitanga than just the surface meaning of the words translated into English.

== Legislation ==
=== Resource Management Act 1991 ===
Under Section 7 of the Resource Management Act 1991 (RMA) all individuals exercising functions and powers in relation to managing the use, development and protection of natural and physical resources are required to "have particular regard" to kaitiakitanga, among other things. The RMA gave the concept of kaitiakitanga a statutory definition in section 2(1) as "the exercise of guardianship; and, in relation to a resource, includes the ethic of stewardship based on the nature of the resource itself". However, opposition to this definition and interpretation resulted in this being amended in the Resource Management Amendment Act 1997 to "the exercise of guardianship by the tangata whenua of an area in accordance with tikanga Māori in relation to natural and physical resources; and includes the ethic of stewardship". Despite this definition, it is the rūnanga holding manawhenua tribal authority over a particular area or resource that will be able to determine the characteristics of kaitiakitanga and how this will be expressed.

Under the RMA all those exercising power have a mandatory obligation to recognise and make provision for Māori cultural values in all aspects of resource management when preparing and administering regional and district plans, which includes the mandated Coastal Policy Statement. There is a requirement within the RMA for at least one New Zealand coastal policy statement to be in effect at all times.

=== Fisheries Act 1996 ===
The Fisheries Act 1996, Part 9, provides for customary fisheries management, without directly identifying this management as kaitiakitanga. There is the role of tāngata tiaki who are chosen by tribal groups (iwi and hapū) and appointed by the Ministry of Fisheries to act as guardians for a specific area. Tāngata tiaki are responsible for issuing permits to catch fish in their area for customary use and must report these catches to the Ministry of Fisheries so that the following year’s catch limits can be set allowing for customary use beyond the recreational fishing bag limits. Tāngata tiaki/kaitiaki may decide to develop management plans for the fisheries within their area of responsibility for approval by the local tangata whenua.

== Exercise of kaitiakitanga ==
=== Taiāpure fisheries ===
A taiāpure (from tai 'coast' + āpure 'a patch or circumscribed area') or local fishery is an area of estuarine or littoral coastal waters that has customarily been of special significance to an iwi or hapū, either as a source of food or for spiritual or cultural reasons. The purpose of designating a taiāpure is to recognise rangatiratanga and fisheries rights secured under Article 2 of the Treaty of Waitangi.

A management committee for the taiāpure is appointed by the Minister of Fisheries, with the members being nominated by tangata whenua. Members may include not only tangata whenua, but also other recreational and commercial fishers and people such as scientists and environmental groups. The committee may recommend regulations to be made by the fisheries minister for the conservation and management of the fish, aquatic life, or seaweed in the taiāpure and to allow the taiāpure to function according to custom. Regulations can be related to the species that may be taken, the dates, seasons and areas for harvesting them, the sizes and quantity that may be taken, and the fishing methods used. Commercial, recreational and customary fishing are all allowed, unless restricted by regulations for that taiāpure.

A taiāpure was established over 90 percent of Akaroa Harbour in February 2006, with the other 10 percent to become the Akaroa Marine Reserve in 2014.

=== Mātaitai reserves ===
A mātaitai reserve (mātaitai means food obtained from the sea or from lakes) is an officially recognised traditional fishing ground with which tangata whenua have a special relationship and where they manage the fisheries resources sustainably. Mātaitai reserves may be in lakes or rivers, as well as in estuaries and coastal waters. Commercial fishing is prohibited, unless regulations specifically allow it for a particular reserve. The tangata whenua manage the non-commercial fishing through tangata tiaki or kaitiaki whom they appoint. Normal amateur fishing regulations apply, unless there are bylaws for the reserve. The tangata tiaki or kaitiaki can recommend bylaws to the Minister of Fisheries. Any bylaws apply to all people fishing in the reserve, although the tangata tiaki or kaitiaki can allow fishing outside the terms of the bylaws for the purpose of sustaining the functions of a marae. Mātaitai reserves are primarily for customary fishing and management, rather than to preserve biodiversity, but they can be set up in a way that meets the criteria for a marine protected area.

=== Rāhui ===
A rāhui is a temporary closure allowed for under Section 186 of the Fisheries Act 1996 and provides for fishing to cease or be restricted in waters of the South Island as part of the Ngāi Tahu Claims Settlement Act 1998. The purpose of a rāhui is to improve the size and/or availability of fish stocks, or to recognise their use and management by tangata whenua. Under Section 186b of the Fisheries Act a temporary closure ends by default after two years, unless it is renewed. A rāhui can be applied for and emplaced for any particular seasons, months, weeks, days or dates.

== Extinction of moa by Māori ==
New Zealand was home to several species of moa (Dinornithiformes) – large, flightless birds. All moa species became extinct following the arrival of Polynesians in the islands during the 13th century. Their extirpation was one of the final megafauna extinctions of the Late Pleistocene extinctions.

Two potential causes of Late Pleistocene extinctions have been proposed: climate change and human predation. Most of the recent megafauna extinctions occurred after the arrival of humans, but proving cause-and-effect is difficult due to the fact the events happened long in the past. The nature of the extinctions varied between species and locations.

Scientific analysis of moa fossils and habitats indicate that their populations were stable and large prior to the arrival of humans. There is no evidence of a gradual decline in population, as might be caused by climate change. When Polynesians arrived, the moa population of New Zealand was estimated to be about 9,200 individuals. Archaeological evidence shows that humans hunted the moa. The moa were extirpated within 100 to 200 years after humans arrived. The extinction of the moa was the most rapid recorded (as of 2014) human-facilitated megafauna extinction. For these reasons, human hunting is most likely the only cause of the moa's extinction.

Oral traditions of the Māori indicate that they were cognizant of the extinctions, and that the extinctions influenced Māori society.

== See also ==
- Māori language influence on New Zealand English
- Religion of Māori people
- Traditional ecological knowledge
