= Ōnuku =

Marae near Akaroa, New Zealand

- Marae and kāinga
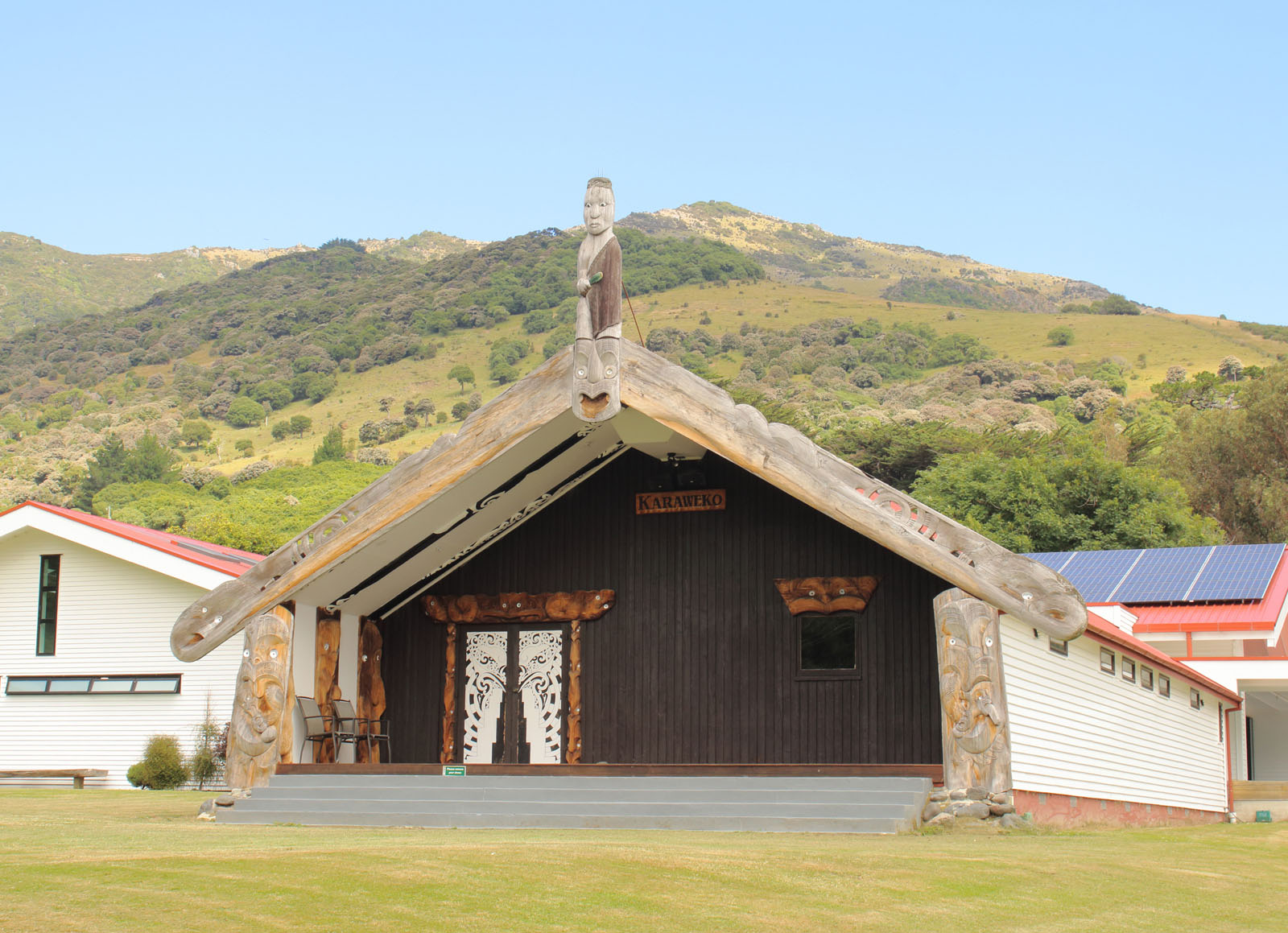
- Karaweko is the whare tipuna (ancestral house) on the marae
- Interactive map of Ōnuku
- Etymology: 'food for a journey', 'never staying long' or 'coming and going'
- Nickname: The Kaik
- Coordinates: 43°50′7.4″S 172°56′46.7″E
- Location: Akaroa, Banks Peninsula, New Zealand
- Iwi: Ngāi Tahu
- Hapū: Ngāi Tārewa and Ngāti Īrakehu
- Opened: 1986
- Whare tīpuna: Karaweko (opened 1997)
- Wharekai: Amīria Puhirere (opened 1990)
- Website: https://www.onuku.nz/

Heritage New Zealand – Category 1
- Official name: Onuku Church (Anglican)
- Designated: 6 June 1985
- Reference no.: 265

Heritage New Zealand – Wāhi Tapu
- Official name: Te Urupā o Kāti Māmoe ki Onuku
- Designated: 14 October 2010
- Reference no.: 9554

Ōnuku, also known as the Kaik, is a settlement and marae near Akaroa on Banks Peninsula, New Zealand. It was the first of three places in the South Island at which the Treaty of Waitangi was signed by Ngāi Tahu. The marae is home to the Ngāi Tārewa and Ngāti Irakehu hapū of Ngāi Tahu.

== Location ==
Ōnuku is on the eastern shore of Akaroa Harbour, 5 kilometres (3.1 mi) south of Akaroa, the nearest town. It sits below the hill peak called Brasenose, also known by the Māori name Ōteauheke. Ōteauheke is listed as a wāhi tapu (sacred site) by Heritage New Zealand.

Te Urupā o Kāti Māmoe ki Onuku, an urupā (burial ground) of the Kāti Māmoe people who once lived in the area, is on the waterfront directly across the road from the marae. It is also listed as a wāhi tapu by Heritage New Zealand.

The Banks Track, a three-day privately owned walking track (originally four days), starts on a farm at Ōnuku, ending in Akaroa.

== History ==
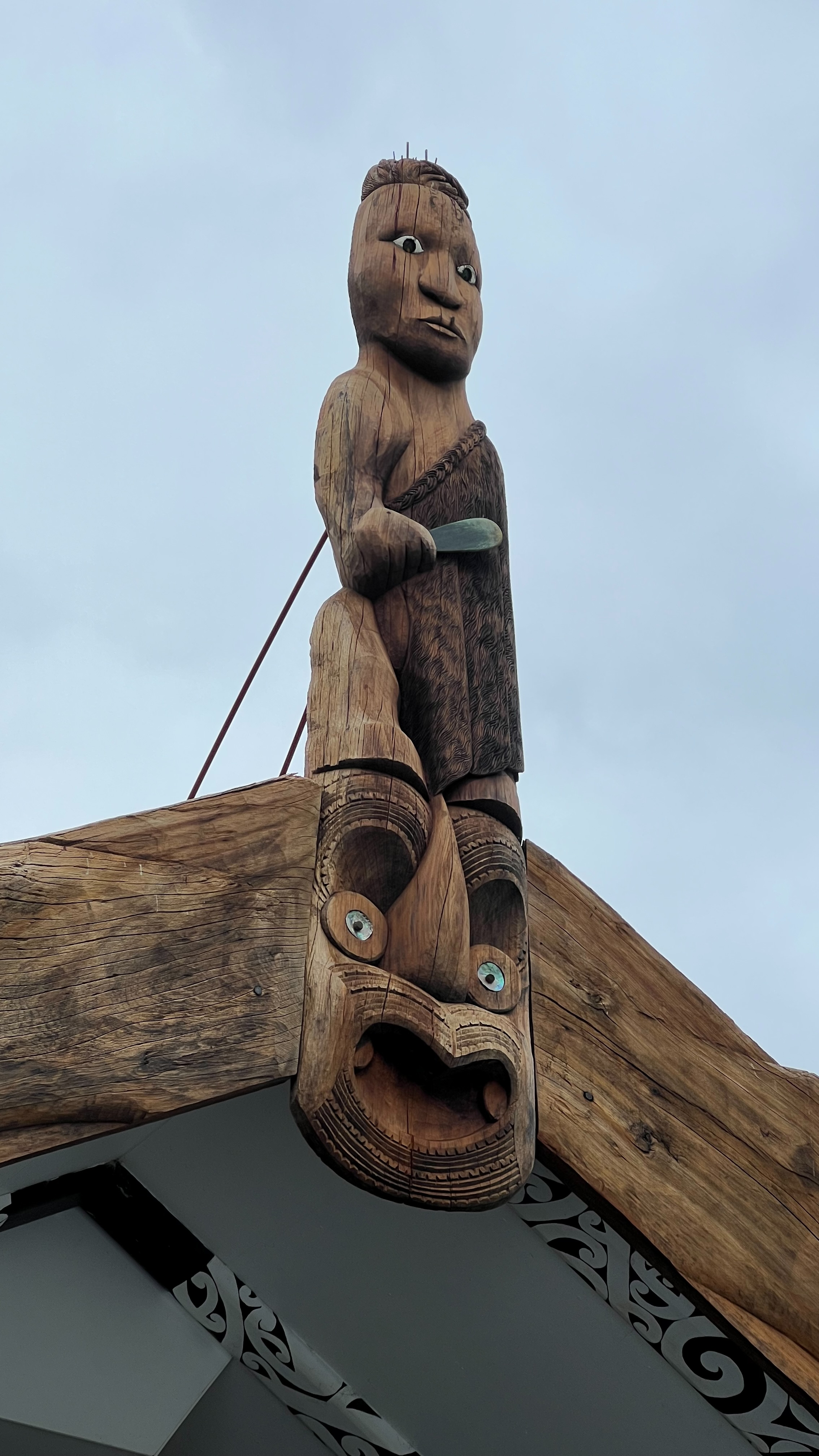
The tekoteko atop the whare tipuna Karaweko depicts Ngāi Tahu paramount ariki (chief) Te Maiharanui.

The name Ōnuku translates to 'food for a journey', 'never staying long' or 'coming and going', as a reference to the kāinga's location as a stopping point on the way to larger settlements in the Akaroa harbour. The area is sometimes also called 'the Kaik', which is a transliteration of the Ngāi Tahu dialect pronunciation of the word kāinga (settlement).

Historically, Ōnuku was an outpost of the larger settlement at Takapūneke. After the massacre at Takapūneke in 1830, in which attackers from the North Island led by Te Rauparaha destroyed the kāinga, survivors relocated to Ōnuku. They were later joined by survivors from the similar attack on the pā at Ōnawe. When French doctor Louis Thiercelin visited Ōnuku in 1840 the kāinga consisted of around 30 small huts, with the chief living in a larger three-room whare (house) closer to the water. By the time the land was set aside as a Native Reserve (No. 886) in 1856, the population of the settlement was around 40 people.

During the mid-1800s Europeans began settling the area, causing much of the land to be taken from the Māori. European settlement grew the town to a population of around 150 at its peak, but it primarily remained a major centre of cultural life for local Māori during the late–nineteenth and twentieth centuries. During the 1840s and 1850s the town grew potatoes to sell to whaling ships and the European settlers at Akaroa. Other food cultivated in the area included maize, wheat, pumpkins and melons, and birds and fish were caught. The Akaroa settlers usually referred to Ōnuku as "Maori Bay". A native school opened in 1880; the school buildings no longer exist, but the schoolmaster's house survives in private ownership.

Ōnuku was the first of three locations in the South Island where the Treaty of Waitangi was signed by Ngāi Tahu chiefs on 30 May 1840. The treaty was brought south from the North Island to Akaroa on the HMS Herald by Major Thomas Bunbury, with Edward Marsh Williams serving as interpreter. It was read aloud and explained by Williams, and after two days of discussion, was brought to Ōnuku to be signed. The signing chiefs were given blankets, but other chiefs on the western side of the harbour decided not to meet with the Europeans. The treaty was signed by only two chiefs: Iwikau and Hone Tīkao. Iwikau was a rangatira (senior leader) of the Ngāti Rangiāmoa hapū of Koukourarata (Port Levy), and half-brother of Ngāi Tahu ariki (paramount chief) Te Maiharanui. Similarly, Hone Tīkao (also known as John Love) was from the Ngāi Te Kahukura and Ngāi Tūāhuriri hapū, and lived in Wakaroa (Pigeon Bay).

== Church ==
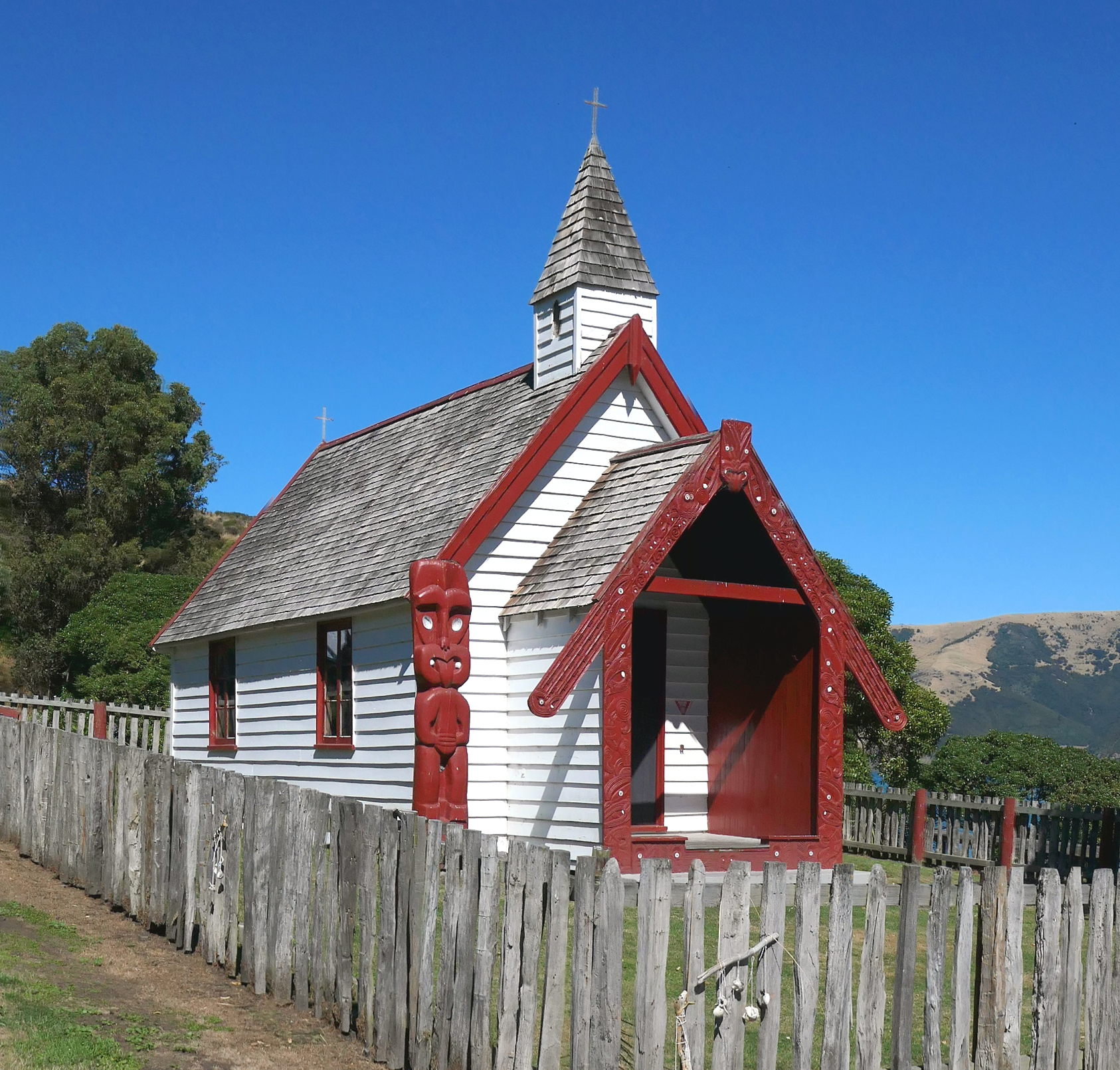
The church at Ōnuku

The foundation stone for a non-denominational church – the first in New Zealand – was laid at Ōnuku in 1876, and the church opened in 1878. Intended as a place of worship for both Māori and Pākehā, the opening of the whare karakia was attended by Māori from all over the country. Built out of timber with a pitched shingle roof, it has a bell turret and room for 60 parishioners. The church was restored and traditional carved panels were added to the porch in 1939 for a centenary of Akaroa service in 1940, an event attended by over 1000. Services were held regularly until 1963. In 1976 a new fence was built, and a poupou Tumiki, carved by Pere Tainui and gifted by Te Wai Pounamu Old Girls Association, was erected beside the church. The church is listed as a Category 1 Historic Place by Heritage New Zealand.

== Marae ==
Beginning in 1986 a new marae was developed opposite the church. The whare kai (dining hall) opened in 1990, and was named Amīria Puhirere after a local female leader who had lived to over 100 years old. The whare tīpuna (ancestral house) opened in 1997. It was named Karaweko in honour of Wiremu Harihona "Big William" Karaweko, who was chief of the settlement from the 1850s to his death in 1884. Karaweko was captured during the sacking of Ōnawe, but was released and returned to live at Ōnuku. The marae project was led by the Whanau-a-Irakehu and supported by the local Lions Club.

The marae is of major significance to local iwi as a cultural centre. The carvings in and around the Karaweko whare tīpuna represent the whakapapa (ancestors) of the hapū, particularly Te Maiharanui and his family.

In 1998, the marae was the location where Prime Minister Jenny Shipley delivered the Crown apology to Ngāi Tahu, the final part of the Ngāi Tahu Claims Settlement Act 1998. Normal marae protocol at the time prevented women from speaking on the ateā; this was relaxed beginning with Shipley's visit. In 2000, Prime Minister Helen Clark visited the marae on Waitangi Day.

In 2007 the marae hosted delegates from the UNESCO World Heritage conference that was held in Christchurch that year.

In 2019, the Governor-General of New Zealand Dame Patsy Reddy attended Waitangi Day commemorations hosted at Ōnuku. In 2025, Prime Minister Christopher Luxon commemorated Waitangi Day at Ōnuku rather than at the Waitangi Treaty Grounds. He was joined by Governor-General Dame Cindy Kiro.

Waitangi Day at Ōnuku

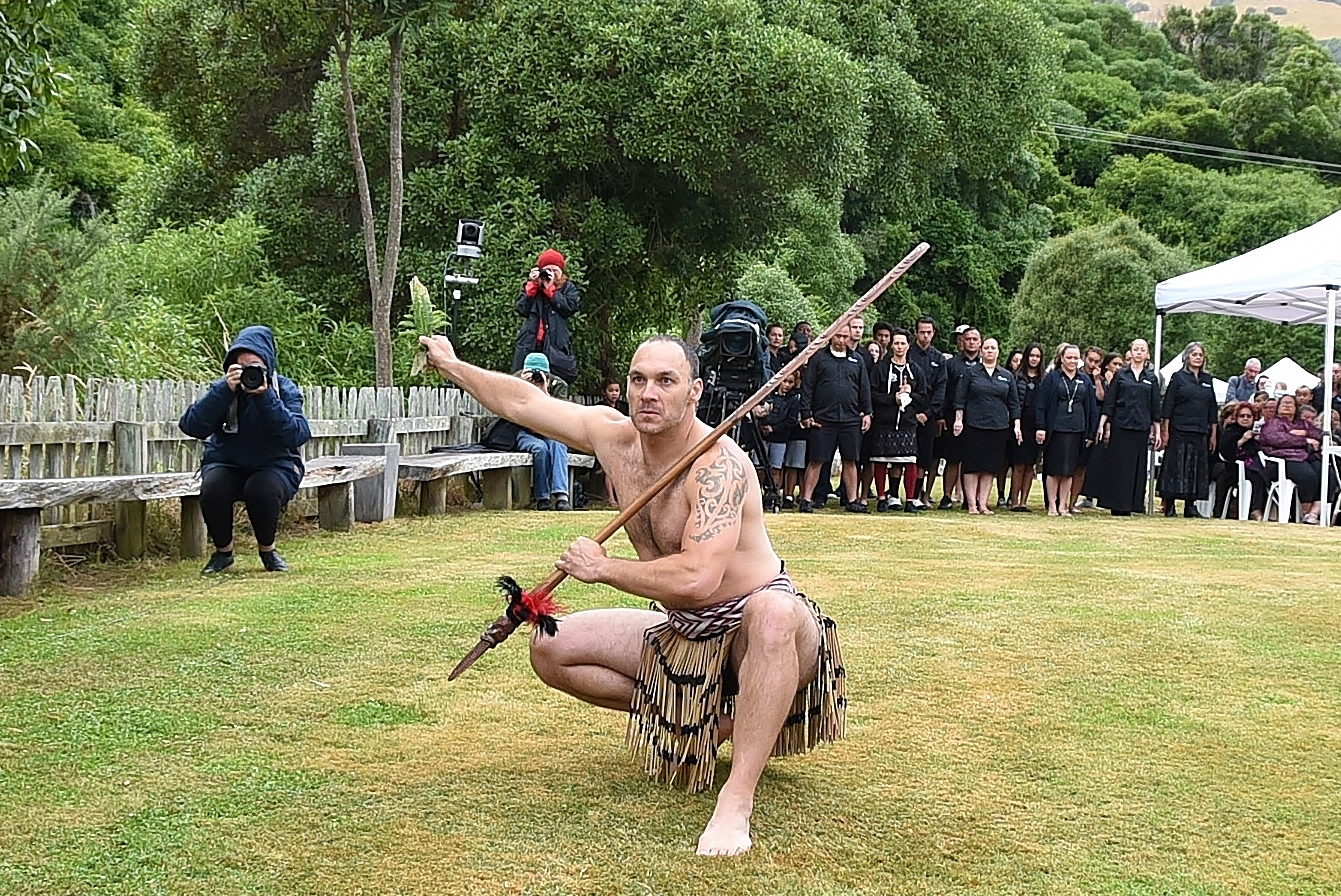
Wero (2019)

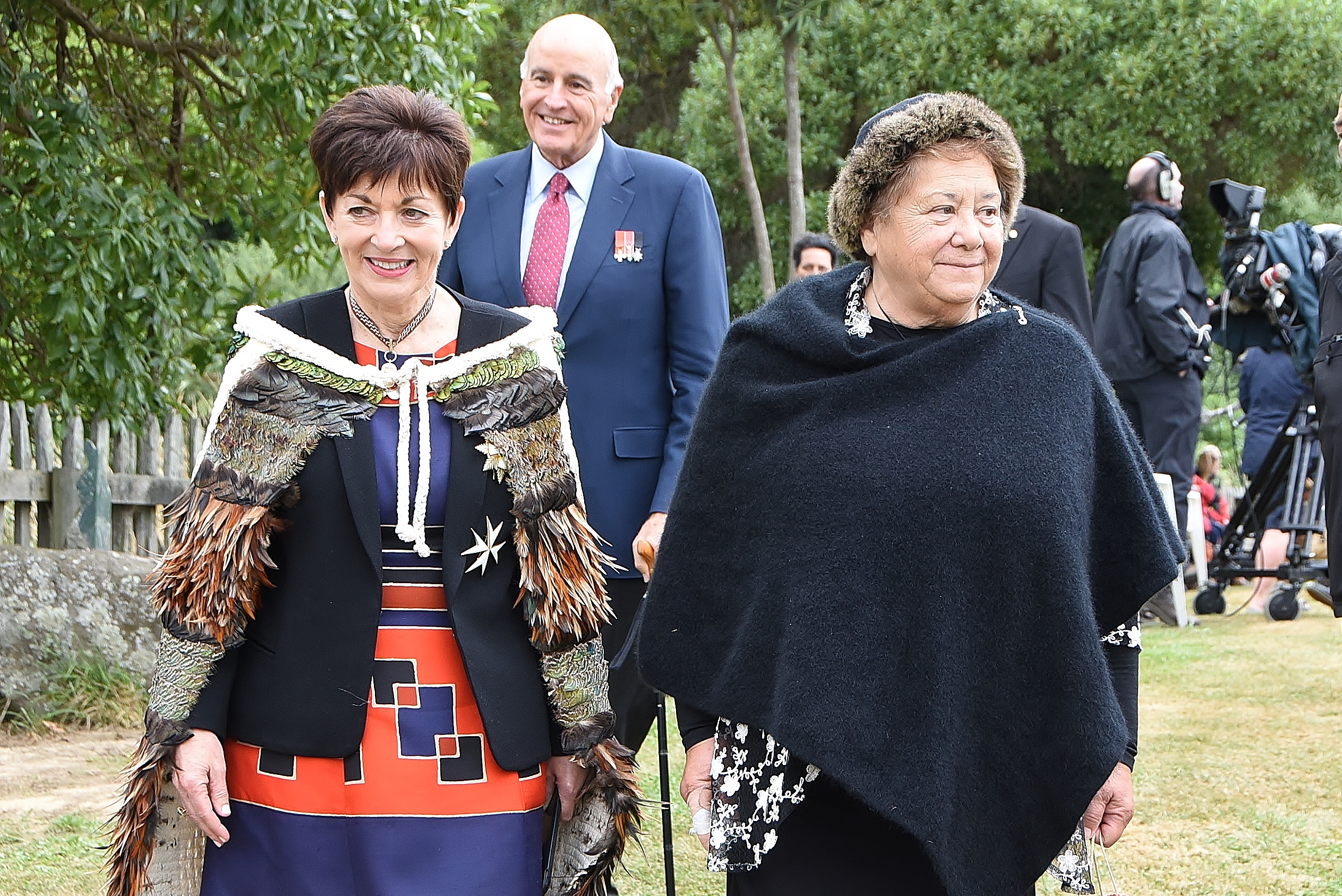
Governor General Dame Patsy Reddy and Rānui Ngārimu (2019)

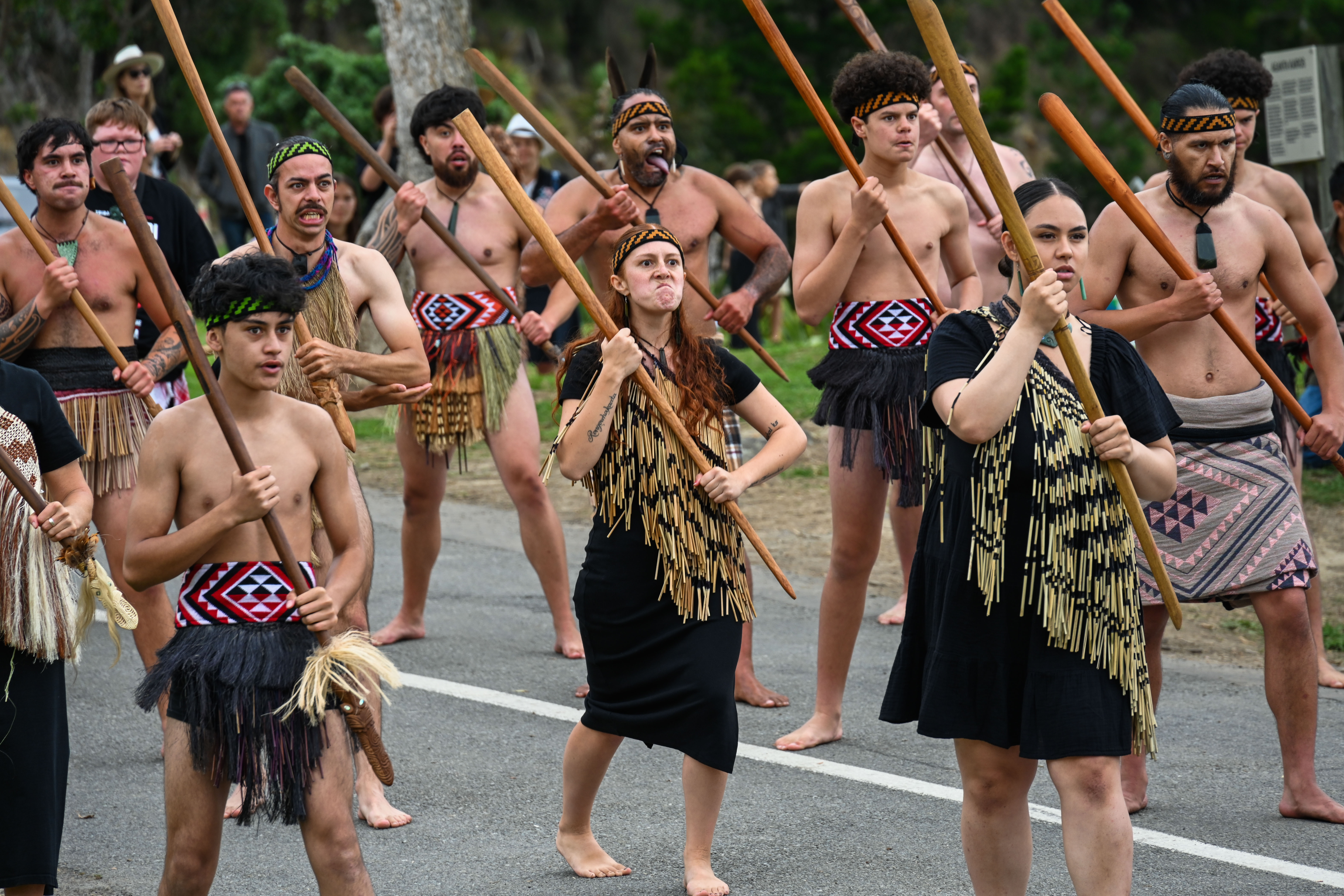
Wero (2025)

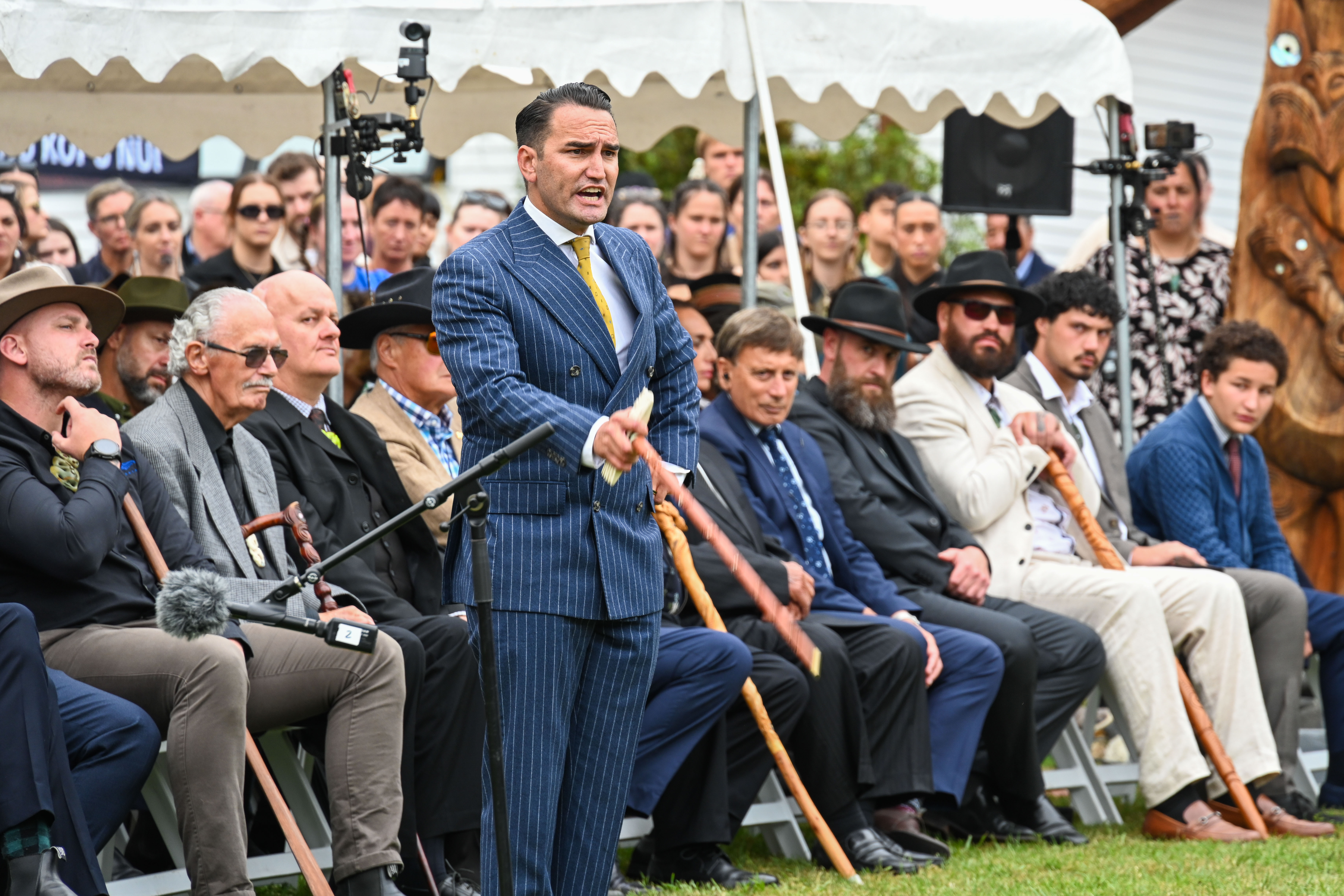
Jymal Morgan delivers whaikōrero (2025)

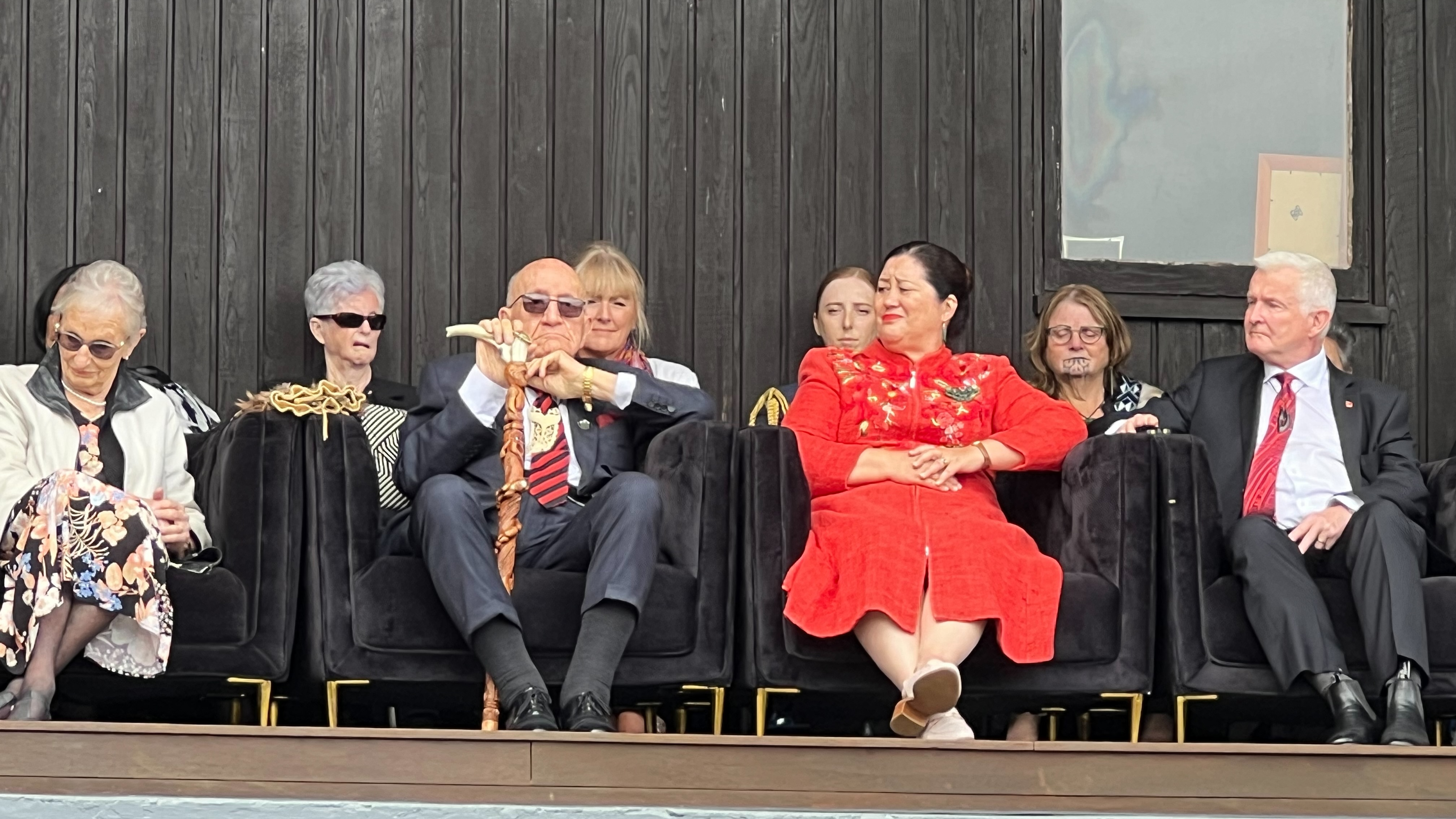
Dignitaries including Tā Tipene O'Regan and Dame Cindy Kiro (2025)
