= Banks Track =

Walking track in Canterbury, New Zealand

- Length: 30 km (19 mi)
- Location: Banks Peninsula, South Island, New Zealand
- Established: 1989
- Highest point: 699 m (2,293 ft)
- Months: October–April

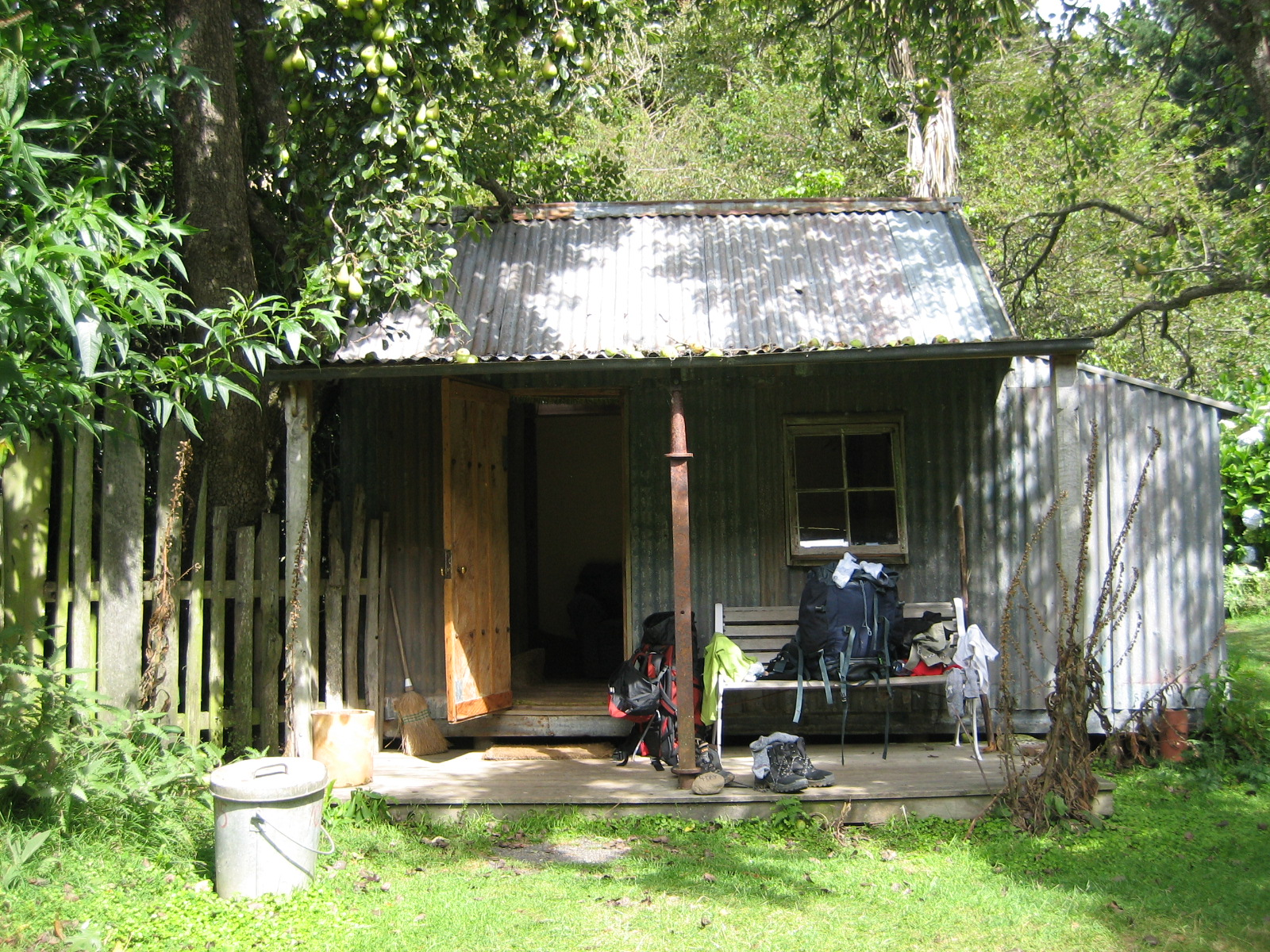
Accommodation at Stony Bay for walkers on the Banks Track

The Banks Track is a 31-kilometre privately owned walking track on Banks Peninsula in the Canterbury Region of the South Island of New Zealand. The track opened in 1989 as the first privately owned track in New Zealand.

== Tramping ==
The track is open from October through April. Accommodation huts along the track are unique and well-equipped.

=== The route ===
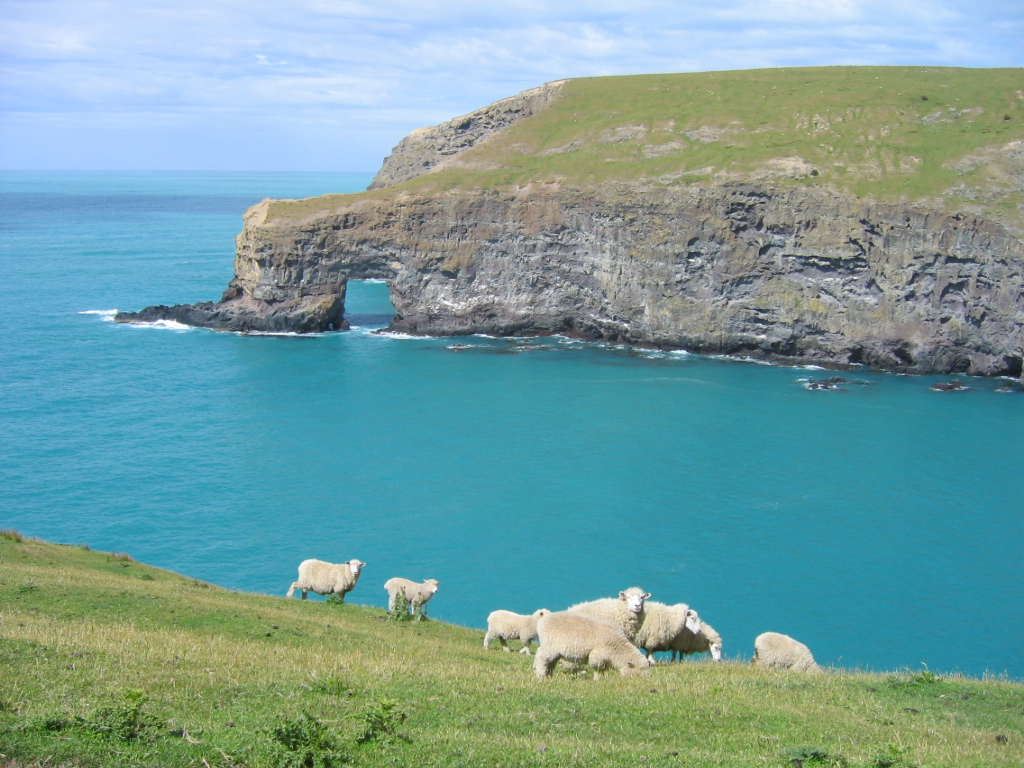
Sheep beside the track with the Sleepy Cove sea arch in the background before it fell in the 2010 Canterbury earthquake. The track was to be rerouted away from this location after the 2016–17 season.

Both the Banks Track Three Day Classic Walk and Banks Track Two Day Hikers Option start and end in Akaroa, with a bus ride to the start of the walking track on a farm at Ōnuku. They reach a maximum altitude of 699 metres (2,293 ft) at Trig GG, traversing a rugged coastline, forests, bush, pastures, and the Hinewai Reserve.

The track sections are:

- Onuku Farm (outside Akaroa) to Flea Bay Cottage (11 km)
- Flea Bay Cottage to Stony Bay Cottage (8 km)
- Stony Bay Cottage to Akaroa (12 km)

Point	Coordinates (links to map & photo sources)	Notes
Onuku Farm Trampers' Hut	43.844650°S 172.950019°E	
Trig GG	43.852957°S 172.964386°E	
Mortlock's Mistake	43.846053°S 172.979590°E	
Flea Bay Cottage	43.866691°S 173.003679°E	
Stony Bay Cottages	43.854491°S 173.037447°E	
Mount Vernon Lodge	43.808057°S 172.981305°E	

== Flora and fauna ==
Among the fauna that may be observed are yellow-eyed penguins, little penguins, spotted shags, sooty shearwaters, fur seals, and Hector's dolphins. Flora observed include nikau palm, kahikatea, and tree ferns.

== Ecotourism ==
The establishment and ongoing stewardship of the track is an example of ecotourism. The track was established by ten landowners, mostly farmers, as a means of supplementing income in response to the fiscal pressures caused by drought and the removal of farm subsidies in the 1980s. A limited liability company was formed to manage track operations. In return for use of the land, track maintenance, and providing accommodation, landowners are given an annual sum based on several factors, including the number of walkers, the amount of land traversed by the track and level of responsibility for track operations.
