= Akaroa Harbour =

Harbour in New Zealand

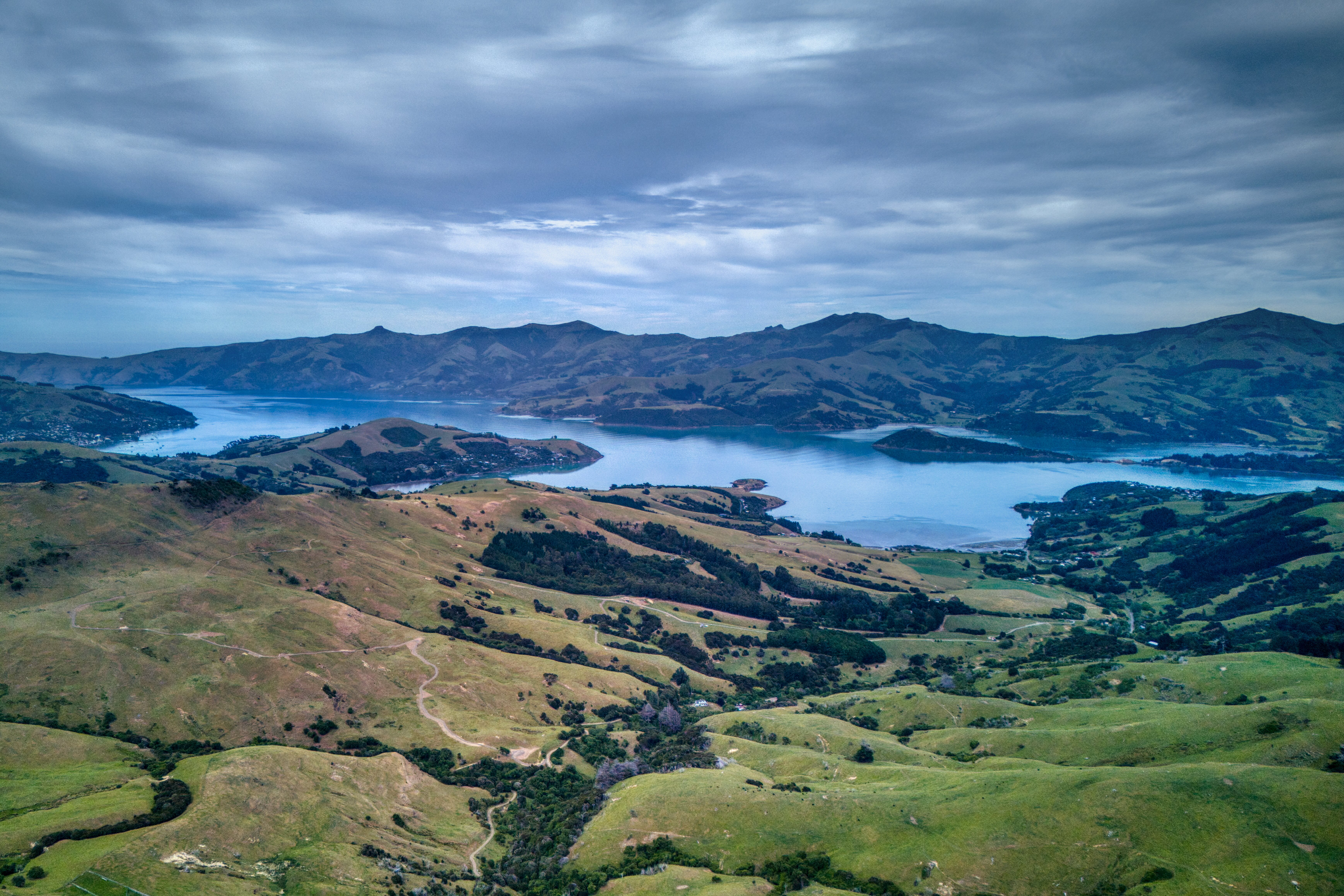
- A photo of Akaroa Harbour with Ōnawe Peninsula clearly visible

- Location within New Zealand

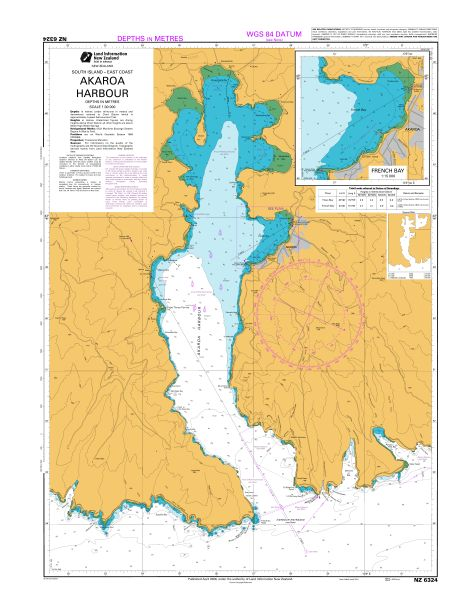
- Nautical chart "NZ 6324 Akaroa Harbour"
- Location: Banks Peninsula
- Coordinates: 43°50′40.56″S 172°55′30.719″E
- Type: Harbour
- Islands: The Long Boat
- Settlements: Akaroa, Duvauchelle, Takapūneke, Takamatua

Akaroa Harbour settlements
Akaroa Harbour settlements

Akaroa Harbour is part of Banks Peninsula in the Canterbury region of New Zealand. The harbour enters from the southern coast of the peninsula, heading in a predominantly northerly direction. It is one of two major inlets in Banks Peninsula, on the coast of Canterbury, New Zealand; the other is Lyttelton Harbour on the northern coast.

The name Akaroa is an alternative spelling of Whakaroa, Whangaroa or Wangaloa from the Kāi Tahu dialect of Māori. Whakaroa means "Long Harbour".

The harbour was used commercially in the mid-19th century for ship-based and shore-based whaling. Cruise ships occasionally enter the harbour, with the passengers visiting Akaroa.

Ōnawe Peninsula is at the head of the harbour, the former site of a Māori pā.

== Settlements ==
Akaroa Harbour's waterfront has been continually inhabited since the 1840s.

Ōnuku, Akaroa, Takapūneke, Takamatua, Robinsons Bay, Duvauchelle, Barrys Bay, French Farm, Tikao Bay and Wainui lie on the shoreline of the harbour. They are connected to the rest of Canterbury via State Highway 75. French Bay, the site of the French settlement of Akaroa, was originally known as Paka Ariki.

=== Demographics ===
The Akaroa Harbour statistical area covers the settlements around the harbour with the exception of Akaroa. It covers 162.14 km^{2} (62.60 sq mi). It had an estimated population of 780 as of June 2025, with a population density of 4.8 people per km^{2}.

Historical population
Year	Pop.	±% p.a.
2006	711	—
2013	756	+0.88%
2018	729	−0.72%
2023	813	+2.21%

Akaroa Harbour had a population of 813 in the 2023 New Zealand census, an increase of 84 people (11.5%) since the 2018 census, and an increase of 57 people (7.5%) since the 2013 census. There were 408 males, 399 females, and 6 people of other genders in 390 dwellings. 2.6% of people identified as LGBTIQ+. The median age was 59.0 years (compared with 38.1 years nationally). There were 75 people (9.2%) aged under 15 years, 72 (8.9%) aged 15 to 29, 360 (44.3%) aged 30 to 64, and 306 (37.6%) aged 65 or older.

People could identify as more than one ethnicity. The results were 91.5% European (Pākehā); 8.1% Māori; 0.7% Pasifika; 4.1% Asian; 1.1% Middle Eastern, Latin American and African New Zealanders (MELAA); and 3.7% other, which includes people giving their ethnicity as "New Zealander". English was spoken by 99.3%, Māori by 1.8%, and other languages by 9.2%. No language could be spoken by 0.7% (e.g. too young to talk). New Zealand Sign Language was known by 0.4%. The percentage of people born overseas was 24.4, compared with 28.8% nationally.

Religious affiliations were 32.5% Christian, 0.4% Hindu, 0.7% Māori religious beliefs, 0.4% Buddhist, 0.7% New Age, and 1.5% other religions. People who answered that they had no religion were 57.6%, and 6.6% of people did not answer the census question.

Of those at least 15 years old, 171 (23.2%) people had a bachelor's or higher degree, 399 (54.1%) had a post-high school certificate or diploma, and 165 (22.4%) people exclusively held high school qualifications. The median income was $36,100, compared with $41,500 nationally. 66 people (8.9%) earned over $100,000 compared to 12.1% nationally. The employment status of those at least 15 was 324 (43.9%) full-time, 144 (19.5%) part-time, and 6 (0.8%) unemployed.

== Geography and natural features ==
The harbour is one of two eroded volcanic centres from the extinct Banks Peninsula Volcano.

The 475-hectare (1,170-acre) Akaroa Marine Reserve was given approval in 2013 after a 17-year campaign to get it established.

As of 2011, of the seven sites that are sampled in the harbour for water quality, six are graded as "good" and one as "fair" in terms of recreational use. Rainfall affects the grading.

The invasive exotic seaweed Undaria pinnatifida (commonly known as wakame, from Japanese) became established in the harbour in the 1990s, where it competes with the native Macrocystis pyrifera (giant kelp). As wakame can be eaten, it is being harvested for sale, which also reduces its impact as a pest.

== Tourism and environmental management ==
In late January 2026 a wildlife cruise, the Black Cat, became grounded at Nīkau Palm Valley Bay. There were 38 passengers and three crew on board the catamaran. The vessel was carrying more than 2000 litres of marine diesel fuel, which spilled into the harbour. Black Cat was a 17 m (56 ft) aluminium alloy boat, built in 1994 for the Whitsunday Islands. She had been running from Akaroa since 2004.

Less than two months later, a Royal New Zealand Navy vessel spilled 200–300 litres of oil into the harbour during a training exercise.

== Image gallery ==
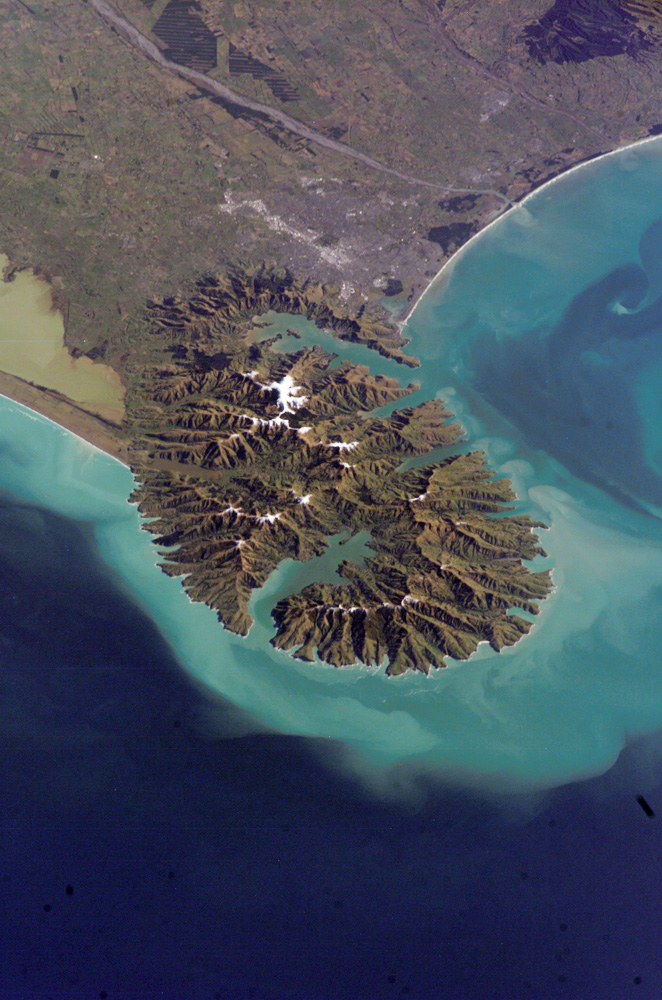
Akaroa Harbour (left / south) and Lyttelton Harbour (right / northwest) in the Banks Peninsula Volcano, viewed in 2006 from the International Space Station

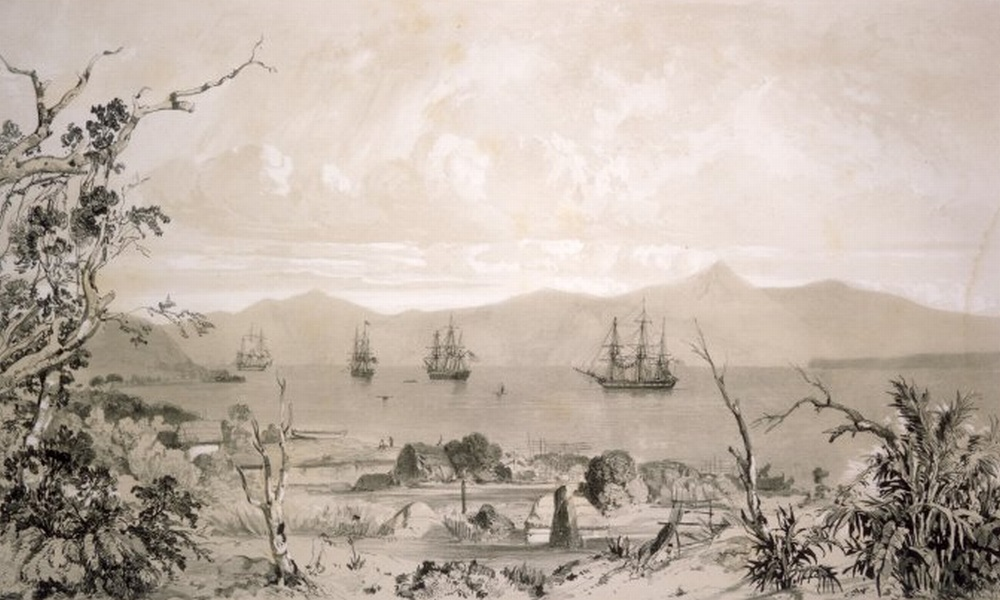
Ships in Akaroa Harbour in the early 19th century. Some Māori whare are in the foreground.

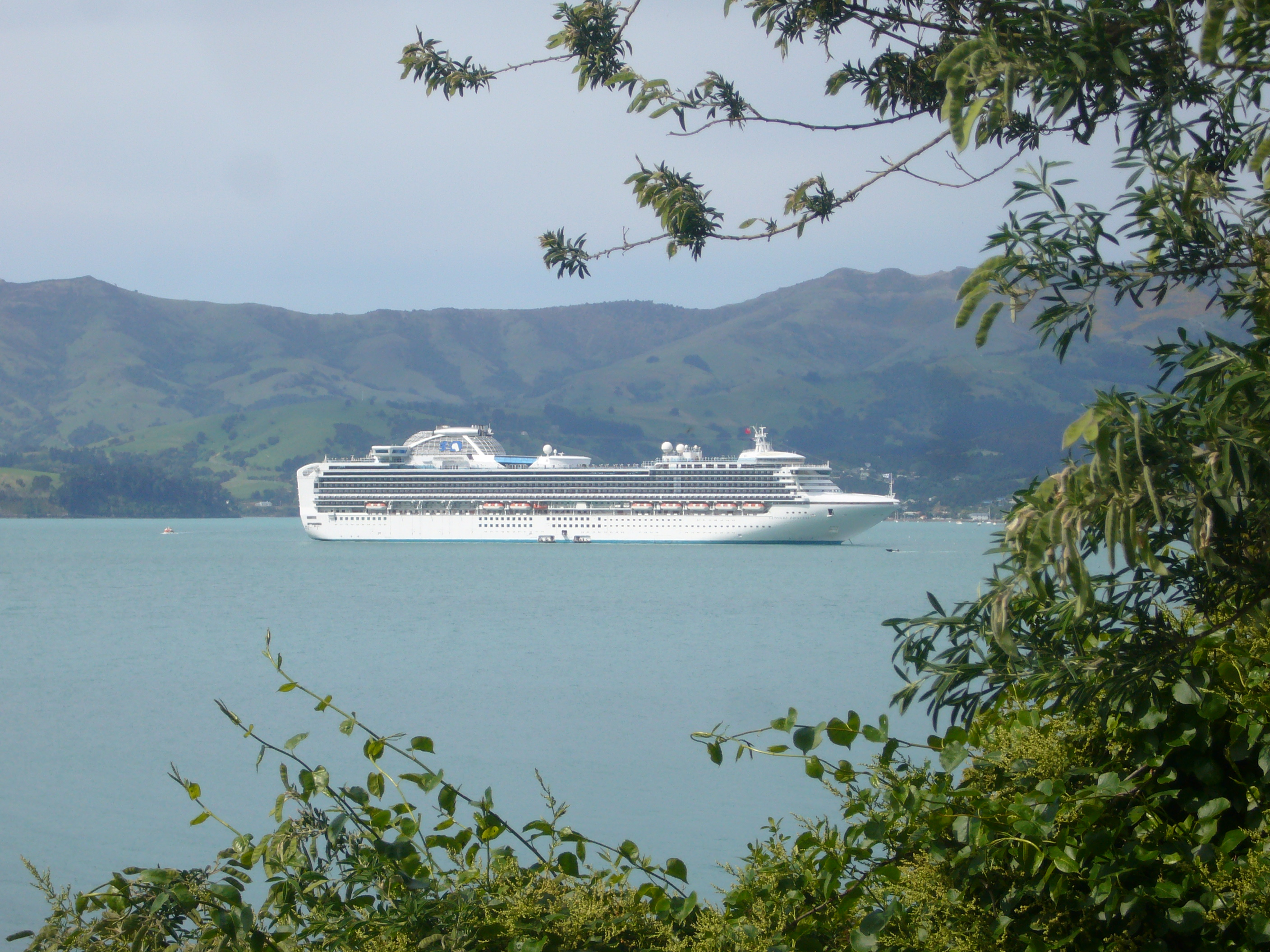
The Sapphire Princess in Akaroa Harbour. (October 2010)

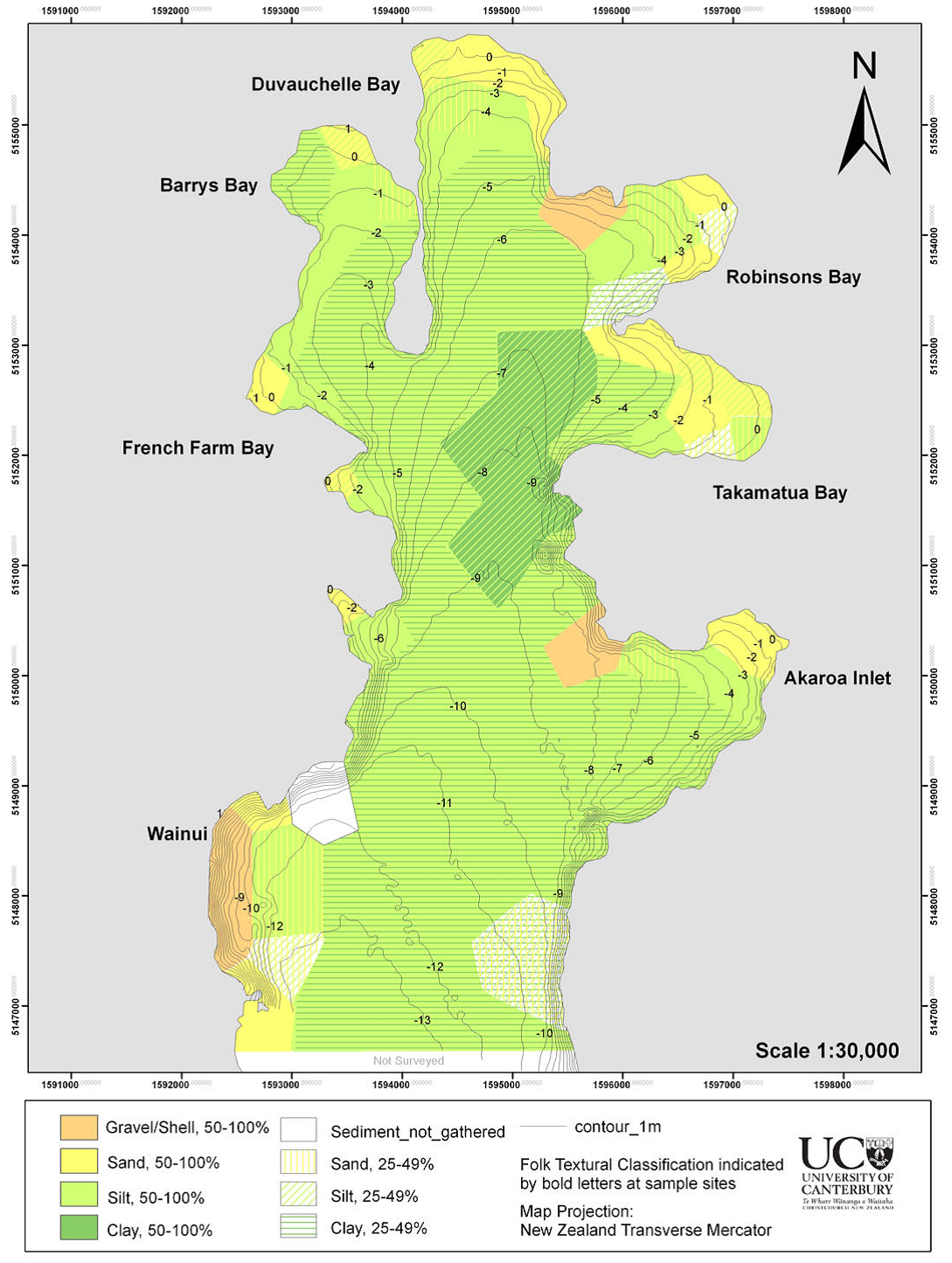
Holding ground of the harbour

== See also ==
- Coastline of New Zealand
