= Penlington =

Penlington is a surname. Notable people with the surname include:

- Alfred Penlington, footballer killed during World War II
- Nathan Penlington, Welsh writer, poet, live literature producer and magician
- Peter Penlington (1932–2025), New Zealand lawyer and judge
- Ross Penlington (1931–2001), former Court of Appeal Judge in Hong Kong
- William Penlington (mayor) (1832–1899), New Zealand builder and mayor
- William Penlington (teacher) (1890–1982), New Zealand school principal and educationalist

== See also ==
- Penington
