= William Penlington =

William Penlington may refer to the following New Zealanders:

- William Penlington (mayor) (1832–1899), builder and mayor
- William Penlington (teacher) (1890–1982), school principal and educationalist
