= Comte de Paris (ship) =

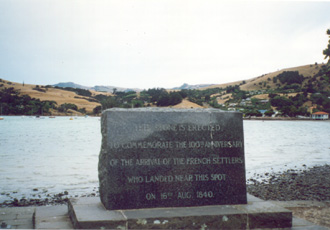
- A memorial commemorating the arrival of the settlers

History
- Name: Comte de Paris
- Route: Rochefort, France to Akaroa, New Zealand
- Launched: 8 March 1840
- Completed: 13 August 1840

General characteristics
- Class & type: Sailing ship
- Tonnage: 501 tonnes

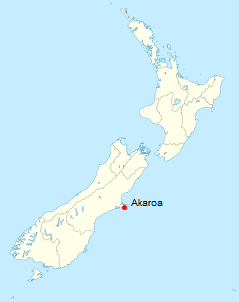
Akaroa, Banks Peninsula

The Comte de Paris was a French sailing ship bound for Akaroa, New Zealand, in 1840. The purpose of the voyage was to develop a French colony in the South Island of New Zealand. The voyage was led by the Commissioner of the King of France, Captain Charles Lavaud, who was to represent the French in New Zealand until a governor arrived.

== Preparations ==
Jean François Langlois was a commander of the French whaling ship Cachalot. He frequently sailed off the coasts of New Zealand and Australia, capturing 45 whales between 1837 and 1839. Approximately 60 French whaling ships were travelling from France to New Zealand and Langlois decided that it would be important to have a French base in New Zealand.

Langlois negotiated with twelve Ngāi Tahu Māori chiefs for ownership of the land. He traded two cloaks, six pairs of trousers, twelve hats, two pairs of shoes, two shirts and some pistols and axes for most of the Banks Peninsula land. In May 1839 he returned to France and formed a small organisation interested in colonising the South Island for the French. The organisation was called Compagnie Nanto-Bordelaise (Nanto-Bordelaise Company).

Compagnie Nanto-Bordelaise obtained King Louis Philippe's signature on 11 December 1839. With permission from the King, they began to prepare for the voyage. The government lent Compagnie Nanto-Bordelaise a 501 tonne whaling ship called Mahé. The Mahé was renamed Comte de Paris after the King’s infant grandson Prince Philippe d'Orléans, Count of Paris, who was born on 24 August 1838. The ship was sent to Rochefort to be outfitted as a whaler because after delivering the settlers, Langlois intended to sail around the waters of New Zealand and Australia.

== Voyage ==
French immigrants travelled from Le Havre to Rochefort on a steamer ship. At Rochefort more immigrants boarded the Comte de Paris. There were 63 immigrants in total and six of them were German. The German passengers boarded when the Comte de Paris started to leak, causing some of the French to abandon the voyage. The Comte de Paris sailed from Rochefort on 8 March 1840.

The voyage got off to a slow start when the steamer towing the Comte de Paris ran into a mud bank. In order to free the Comte de Paris, cargo had to be removed to lighten her load. After ten days the ship was able to continue sailing. The five month passage was uncomfortable because the Comte de Paris steered very badly. The voyage almost came to an end on the night of 11 July. A huge storm off the coast of Tasmania caused lighting to strike the topmast and foremast, nearly capsizing the ship. There were three deaths during the voyage and one birth. Jacques Jotereau, aged 38, died in sight of Banks Peninsula, Jean François Cardin, aged 25, died while anchored at Pigeon Bay and Maguerite David died at the age of four months. Armand Isidore Desprairies Libeau was born on board on 24 April 1840 and was named after the second captain Charles Armand Isidore Desprairies.

== Arrival and settlement ==
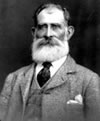
Charles de Malmanche

The Comte de Paris arrived in Akaroa, New Zealand on 13 August 1840. Unknown to the French and German immigrants, they had landed in a British colony. This is because on 6 February 1840 the South Island chiefs signed the Treaty of Waitangi. The Treaty represents an agreement over land ownership between the British Crown and Māori tribes. The settlers were offered free passage to Tahiti or the Marquesas when they learnt that they had arrived in a British colony. None accepted this offer. The French Government then came to an agreement with the British Government in 1841 that the British Government would protect the rights of the French immigrants in Akaroa. Eventually the settlers were granted official ownership of the land by the British. The immigrants established two small towns in Akaroa and by 1843 they numbered 69 settlers.

The first French baby to be born in Akaroa was Charles Joseph de Malmanche on 19 October 1840. He was born in a tent on the beach to parents Emeri De Malmanche and Rose Jeanne Victoire De Malmanche (née Jerzeau).

In the 1850s the French navy left Akaroa due to the decline in whaling.

== Passenger list ==
The following is the Comte de Paris manifest detailing the names of the founders of the colony of Port Louis-Philippe. Individuals are grouped generally by the family name as at embarkation in Rochefort which may have later changed due to marriage or re-marriage after arrival in 1840.

Family	Members	Nationality	Place of origin
Benoit	Pierre; Louise	French	Charente-Maritime
Bernard	Marguerite; Pierre	French	
Bouriaud	Elie; Marie (m. Elie)	French	Charente-Maritime
Breitmeyer	Johann (b. 1804); Johann (b. 1832); Eva (m. Johann); Johann (b. 1838); Elisabeth; Katharina	(German Confederation) German	
Cébert	Jacques Michel; Jeanne (m. Jacques Michel)	French	
Chardin		French	
David	Anne; Guillaume; Jean; Marguerite	French	Paris
Desse	Jean-Delphin	French	
Dulac		French	
Dupas		French	
Etéveneaux	Jean-Pierre; Jeanne; Jean Baptiste (m. Catherine-Mélanie Libeau); Célestine (m. Jules Véron); Judith (m. Christian Jakob Waeckerle)	French	Le Jura
Fleuret	Georges	French	La Manche
François	Jean Adolphe	French	Paris
Gendrot	Clémence (m. Joseph Libeau); Hippolyte; Pierre; Victoire	French	Sarthe
Guindon	Benjamin; Isabeau (née Thibeau, m. Benjamin)	French	Charente-Maritime
Gurtner	Niklaus	(German Confederation) German	
Hahn	Joseph	(German Confederation) German	
Haulmé		French	
Hettich	Kaspar	(German Confederation) German	
Jotereau		French	
Le Duc	Isaac	French	Charente-Maritime
Lelièvre	François (m. Justine-Rose Malmanche)	French	La Manche
Libeau	Armand Isidore; Joseph (b. 1834, m. Clémence Gendrot); Joseph (b. 1807); Madeleine (née Chauvert, m. Joseph); Catherine-Mélanie (m. Jean Baptiste Etéveneaux)	French	Charente-Maritime
de Malmanche	François; Pierre; Justine-Rose (m. François Lelièvre); Emeri; Victoire (m. Emeri)	French	Charente
Massé		French	
Michel	Alfred	French	Puy-de-Dôme
Pigoulet		French	
Rousselot	François; Adèle (m. François)	French	La Moselle
Véron	Jules (m. Célestine Etéveneaux) & wife	French	La Manche
Vidal	Etienne	French	
Waeckerle	Christian Jakob (m. Judith Etéveneaux) & wife	(German Confederation) German	
Walter	Philipp (b. 1795); Philipp	(German Confederation) German	
Woll		(German Confederation) German	

Armand Isidore Libeau was born on board the Comte de Paris in April 1840 several months before the ship made landfall in the South Island.

== Influence on New Zealand ==
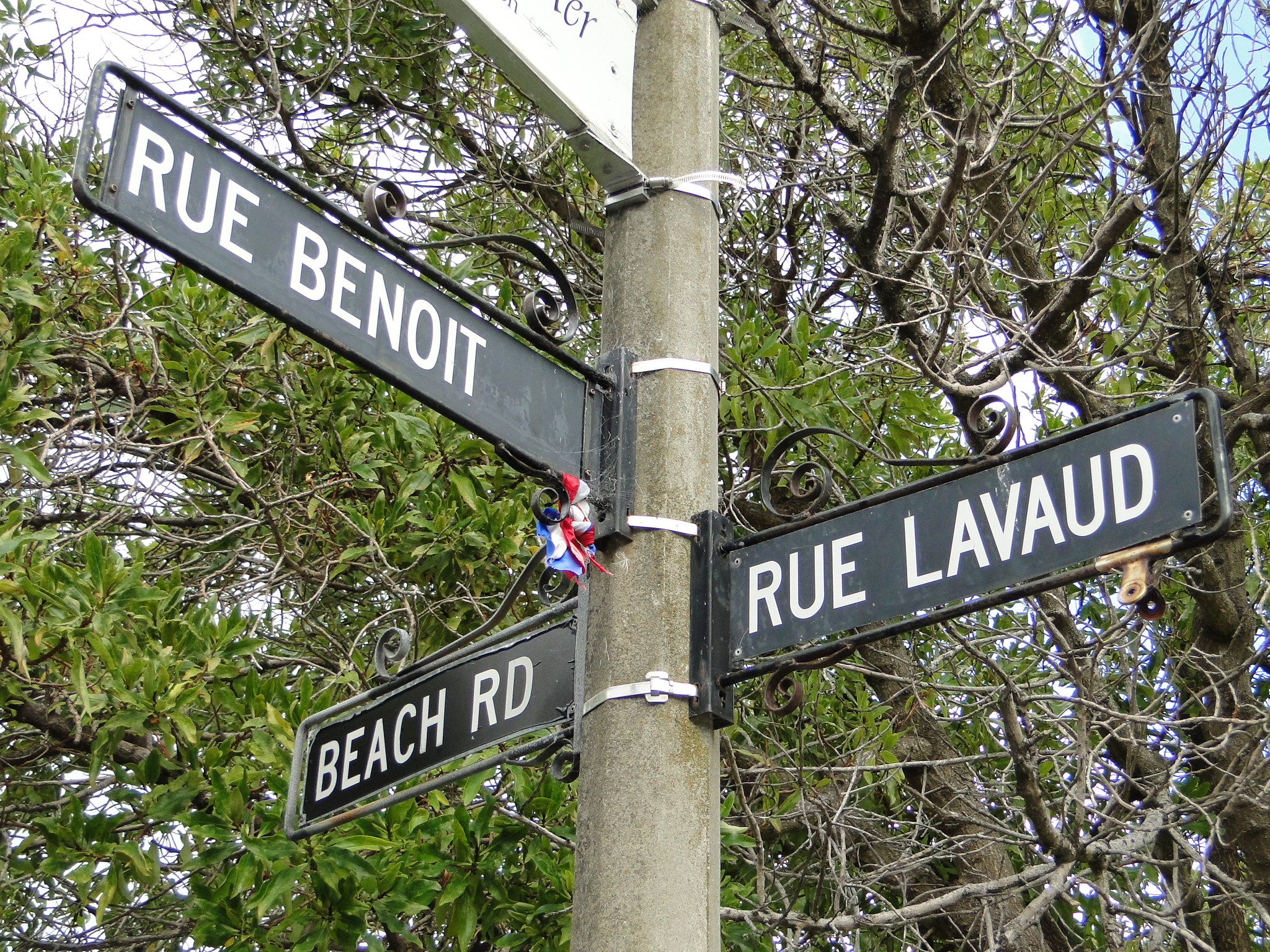
Akaroa street names

The arrival of the settlers has influenced Akaroa in society today. Some of the street names there today are in French, for example, Rue Balguerie and Rue Benoit. Thousands of descendants in New Zealand also carry French names. Every year in Akaroa a festival is held to celebrate the arrival of the French and German immigrants.
