= Duvauchelle =

Town in Canterbury, New Zealand

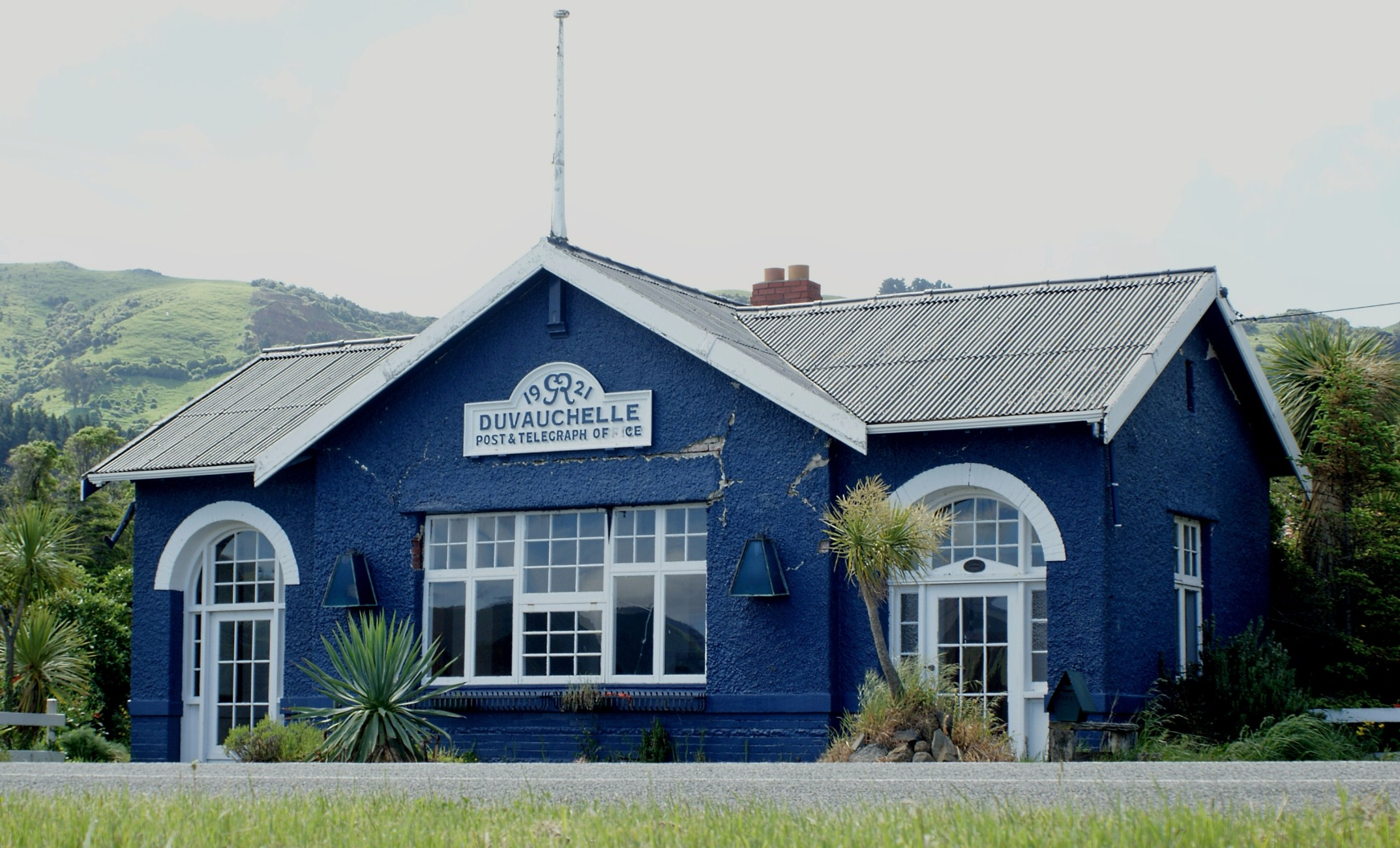
- Duvauchelle Post Office (c. 1921)

- Rural settlement area within Christchurch City Council boundaries

- Location within South Island Location within New Zealand
- Coordinates: 43°44′59″S 172°55′56″E
- Country: New Zealand
- Region: Canterbury Region
- District: Christchurch City
- Ward: Banks Peninsula
- Community: Te Pātaka o Rākaihautū Banks Peninsula
- Electorates: Banks Peninsula; Te Tai Tonga (Māori)

Government
  - Territorial Authority: Christchurch City Council
  - Regional council: Environment Canterbury
  - Mayor of Christchurch: Phil Mauger
  - Banks Peninsula MP: Vanessa Weenink
  - Te Tai Tonga MP: Tākuta Ferris

Area
  - Total: 1.65 km^{2} (0.64 sq mi)

Population (June 2025)
  - Total: 210
  - Density: 130/km^{2} (330/sq mi)

Duvauchelle (Māori: Kaitouna) is a small town situated at the head of Akaroa Harbour on Banks Peninsula in New Zealand. State Highway 75 passes through the town. The Ōnawe Peninsula separates Duvauchelle bay from Barry's Bay.

Duvauchelle is now part of Christchurch City Council jurisdiction since the city's amalgamation with Banks Peninsula District in 2006. From 1910 until 1989, Duvauchelle was the seat of the Akaroa County Council.

== History ==
The site of an ancient Māori pā or fortified settlement is at Oinako, where the Duvauchelle Hotel stands today. At Te Wharau creek, a taua or war party of Ngāti Awa warriors camped during the battles led by Te Rauparaha in 1831.

The name of the town and bay comes from the surname of two brothers Jules-Augustin and Louis-Benjamin Duvauchelle, who held land there from the Nanto-Bordelaise Company, at the time of the French settlement at Akaroa in the 1840s. In the following decade, land alongside Duvauchelle Bay was leased from the Canterbury Association by British settlers, including William Augustus Gordon, who was the brother of Charles George Gordon, the famous soldier and colonial administrator, known as "Gordon of Khartoum" after his death. The first freeholds were bought in 1857; economic activity was focused on timber extraction and sawing, mostly tōtara trees (Podocarpus totara). Domestic pigs were grazed in the forest, who mingled with the feral pigs that were already present. As the tree cover was cleared, it was replaced with pasture. The first settler at the Head of the Bay, the location of the present town, was a Frenchman called Libeau, who arrived in 1841. Timber exploitation was also the main activity, as well as boat building. The sawn timber was all carried out of the bay by locally built vessels. A public house and a shop were built in the 1850s. A small building that served as both church and school was built by people on a half-acre plot of land donated by Lord Lyttelton. The first permanent roads began to be constructed in the 1860s and 1879 saw the arrival of the County Council offices and the Post Office.

Both the Duvauchelle Hotel and the post office were badly damaged by the earthquakes that struck the region in 2010 and 2011. The oldest parts of the hotel were demolished after the earthquakes, the remaining parts of the building were reopened as a single-storey establishment in September 2013.

== Demographics ==
Duvauchelle is described by Stats NZ as a rural settlement, and covers 1.65 km^{2} (0.64 sq mi). It had an estimated population of 210 as of June 2025, with a population density of 127 people per km^{2}. It is grouped with other settlements including French Farm, Wainui, Robinson's Bay and Takamatua as the statistical area of Akaroa Harbour.

Historical population
Year	Pop.	±% p.a.
2006	171	—
2013	210	+2.98%
2018	180	−3.04%
2023	213	+3.42%

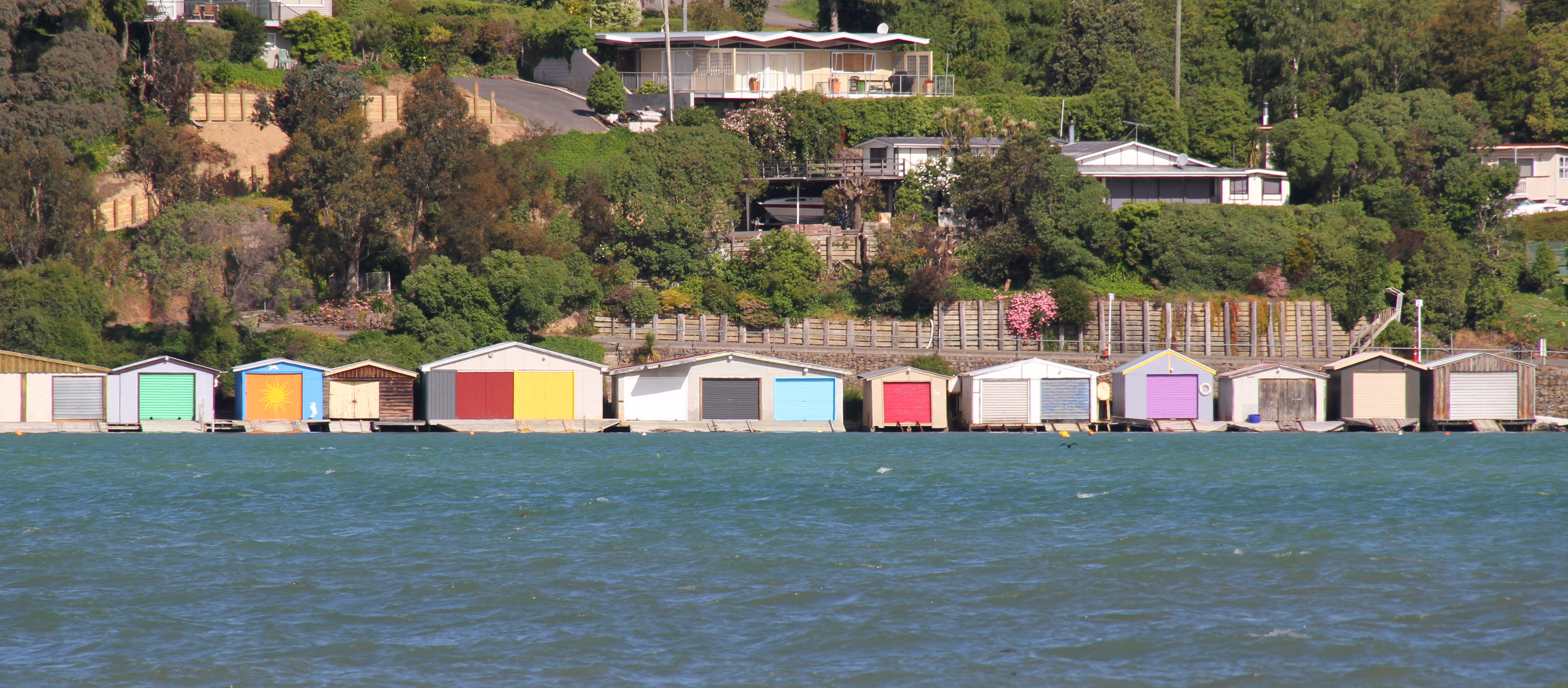
Duvauchelle boathouses

Duvauchelle had a population of 213 in the 2023 New Zealand census, an increase of 33 people (18.3%) since the 2018 census, and an increase of 3 people (1.4%) since the 2013 census. There were 105 males, 111 females, and 3 people of other genders in 105 dwellings. 1.4% of people identified as LGBTIQ+. The median age was 56.5 years (compared with 38.1 years nationally). There were 24 people (11.3%) aged under 15 years, 21 (9.9%) aged 15 to 29, 90 (42.3%) aged 30 to 64, and 81 (38.0%) aged 65 or older.

People could identify as more than one ethnicity. The results were 88.7% European (Pākehā); 7.0% Māori; 1.4% Pasifika; 7.0% Asian; 1.4% Middle Eastern, Latin American and African New Zealanders (MELAA); and 5.6% other, which includes people giving their ethnicity as "New Zealander". English was spoken by 98.6%, Māori by 2.8%, and other languages by 8.5%. No language could be spoken by 1.4% (e.g. too young to talk). The percentage of people born overseas was 19.7, compared with 28.8% nationally.

Religious affiliations were 31.0% Christian, 1.4% Hindu, 1.4% Buddhist, and 1.4% New Age. People who answered that they had no religion were 60.6%, and 4.2% of people did not answer the census question.

Of those at least 15 years old, 36 (19.0%) people had a bachelor's or higher degree, 114 (60.3%) had a post-high school certificate or diploma, and 36 (19.0%) people exclusively held high school qualifications. The median income was $35,900, compared with $41,500 nationally. 15 people (7.9%) earned over $100,000 compared to 12.1% nationally. The employment status of those at least 15 was 90 (47.6%) full-time, 27 (14.3%) part-time, and 3 (1.6%) unemployed.

== Education ==
Duvauchelle School is a contributing primary school catering for years 1 to 6. It had a roll of 25 as of July 2026. The school was established in 1860.
