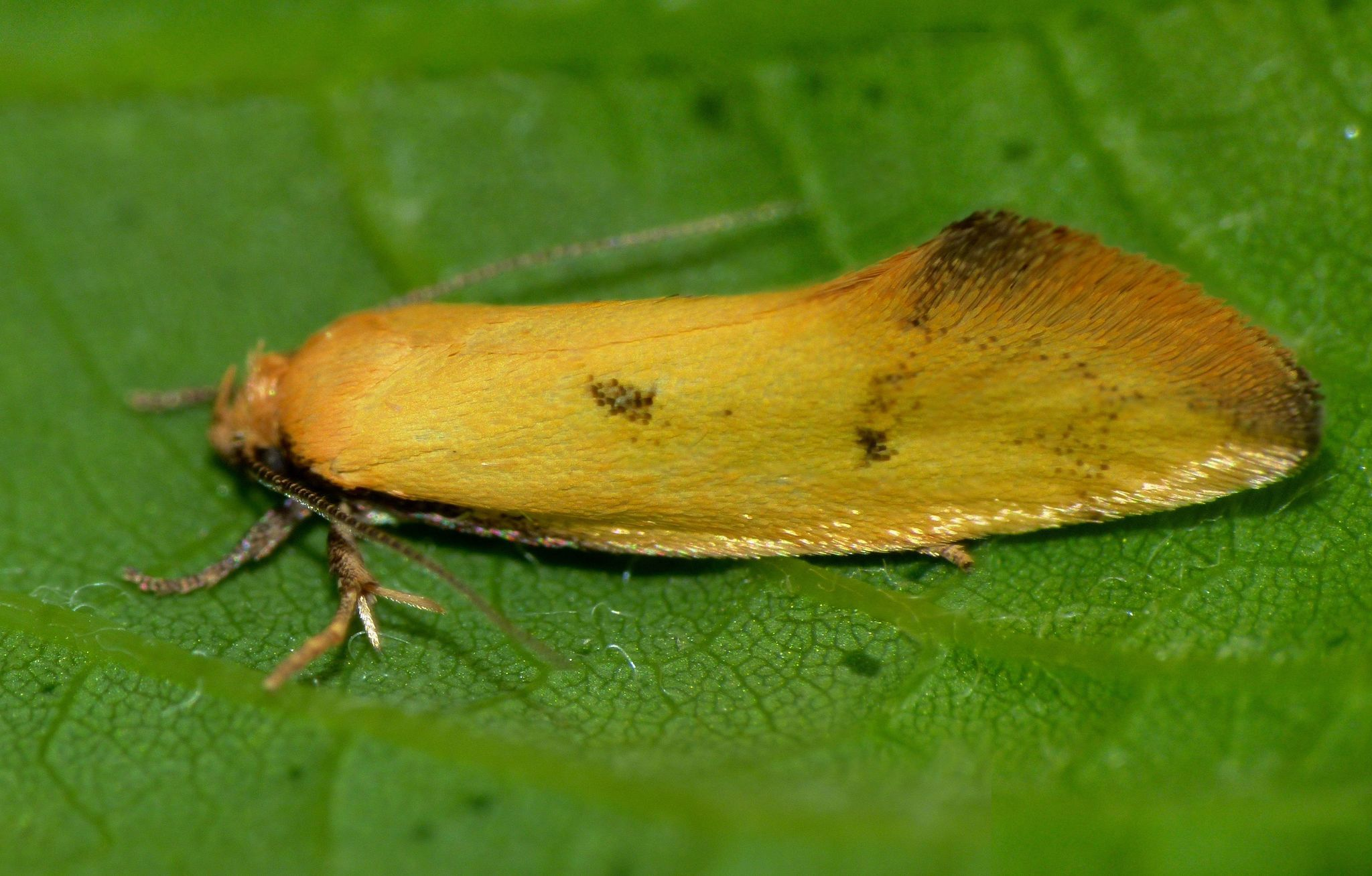

Scientific classification
- Kingdom: Animalia
- Phylum: Arthropoda
- Class: Insecta
- Order: Lepidoptera
- Family: Oecophoridae
- Genus: Tingena
- Species: T. grata

Binomial name
- Tingena grata (Philpott, 1927)

Synonyms
- Borkhausenia grata Philpott, 1927

= Tingena grata =

Species of moth, endemic to New Zealand

Tingena grata is a species of moth in the family Oecophoridae. It is endemic to New Zealand and has been found in the South Island. The adults of this species are on the wing from November to January.

== Taxonomy ==
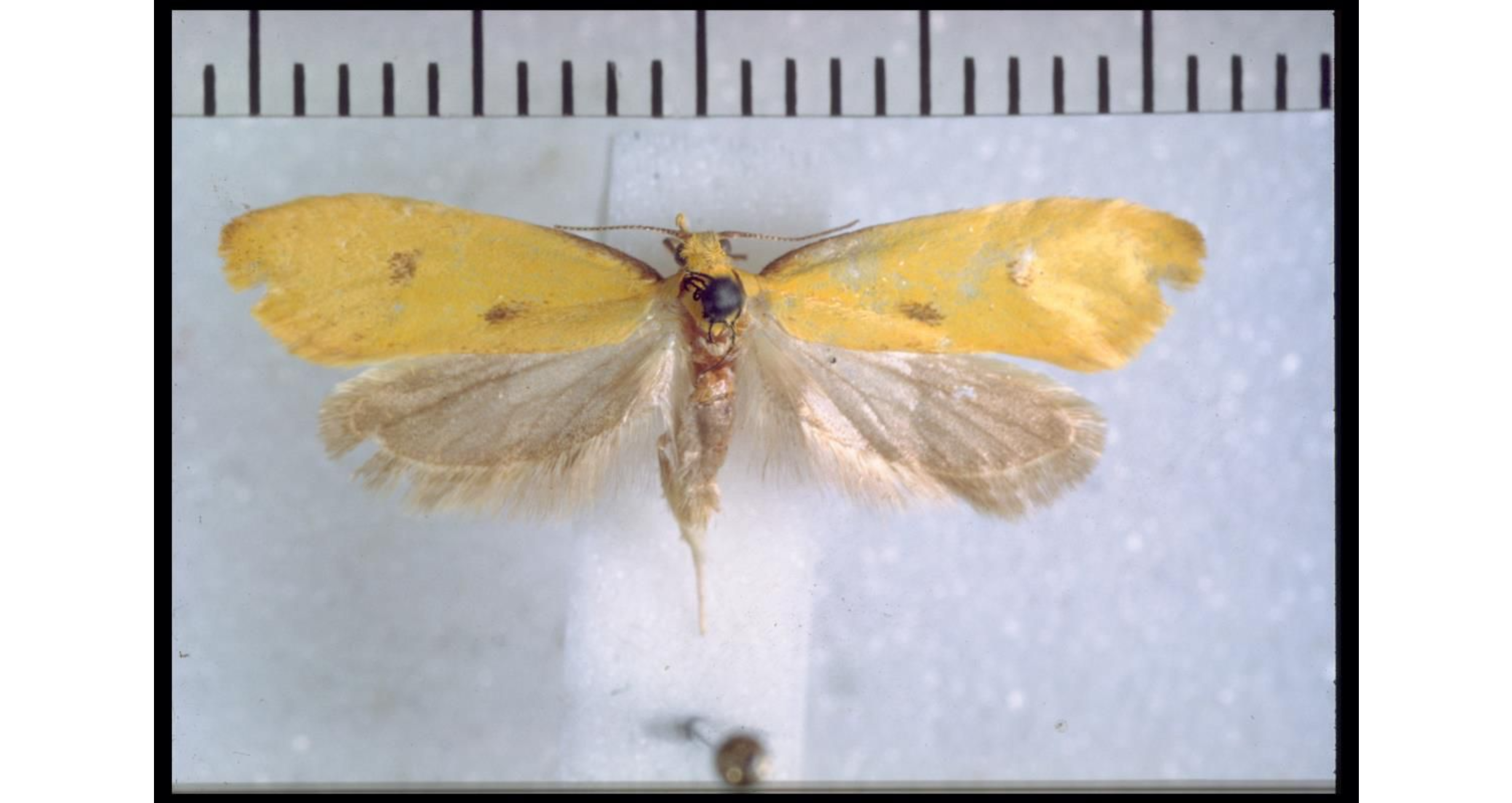
Tingena grata holotype

This species was first described by Alfred Philpott in 1927 using specimens collected at Dun Mountain in Nelson at 2000 – 3000 ft between November and January. Philpott originally named the species Borkhausenia grata. In 1939 George Hudson discussed this species in his book A supplement to the butterflies and moths of New Zealand using the same name. In 11988 J. S. Dugdale placed this species within the genus Tingena. The male holotype is held in the New Zealand Arthropod Collection.

== Description ==
Philpott described the species as follows:

♂. 20–22 mm. Head and thorax light orange-yellow. Palpi light orange-yellow, second segment, except near apex, fuscous outwardly. Antennae ringed alternately with ochreous-grey and fuscous, ciliations in male ¾. Abdomen fuscous-grey, anal tuft ochreous. Legs whitish-ochreous, anterior pair infuscated. Forewings moderate, broad, costa moderately arched, apex bluntly pointed, termen rounded, oblique; light orange-yellow; costal margin purplish-fuscous from base to about ¼; a purplish-fuscous spot on fold before middle, sometimes absent or represented only by one or two scales; a similar spot in disc at ⅔; fringes concolorous with wing. Hindwings light fuscous-grey; fringes light fuscous-grey, with obscure darker basal line.

This species is similar in appearance to but can be distinguished from Tingena apertella as it is larger, has broader wings and has a clearer ground colour to its forewings. Unmarked specimens of this species can also be confused with Tingena enodis but can be distinguished as T. enodis has costa of its forewings that are more arched and it is paler in colour in comparison to T. grata. Hudson comments that this species can be distinguished from T. apertella only by the genitalic characteristics of the male.

== Distribution ==
This species is endemic to New Zealand and as well as being collected at its type locality of the Dun Mountain, it has been collected at Aoraki / Mount Cook.

== Behaviour ==
This species is on the wing from November to January.
