= Akaroa County =

Former county of New Zealand

Coordinates: 43.7498°S 172.9321°E

- County of New Zealand
- 1876–1989
- Capital: Duvauchelle
- Area
- 440.48 km^{2} (170.07 sq mi)
- History
  - Established: 1876
  - Disestablished: 1989
- Today part of: Christchurch City Council

Akaroa County was one of the counties of New Zealand in the South Island. The council first met in Akaroa court house on 4 January 1877. In 1880 new offices were opened at Duvauchelle.

== See also ==
- List of former territorial authorities in New Zealand § Counties
