= Nanto-Bordelaise Company =

French colonial company

The Nanto-Bordelaise Company — formally La Compagnie de Bordeaux et de Nantes pour la Colonisation de l’Île du Sud de la Nouvelle Zélande et ses Dépendances — was a French company inaugurated in 1839 by a group of merchants from the cities of Nantes and Bordeaux, with the purpose of founding a French colony in the South Island of New Zealand.

The company was formed after negotiations in August 1838 between whaling boat captain Jean-François Langlois and several Ngāi Tahu Māori chiefs for the purchase of several thousand acres of land on Banks Peninsula, for which Langlois promised to pay a total of 1,000 francs. Upon returning to France in 1839, Langlois set about founding a company with the help of several financial backers, the eventual aim of which was to claim the entirety of the South Island for France. Government support was obtained in December of the same year via King Louis-Philippe to transport 80 settlers to Port Louis-Philippe (now Akaroa). A warship, the corvette Aube, would travel to New Zealand, followed a month later by the colonists aboard Comte de Paris. Aube left for the Pacific in February 1840, captained by Charles François Lavaud, who had been appointed as Commissaire du Roi.

Aware of the potential threat of losing sovereignty of parts of the New Zealand island chain to the French, during early 1840, Lieutenant-Governor William Hobson was tasked with securing the whole of the country for the British Government. To this end, the Treaty of Waitangi was signed as an agreement between the British Crown and the indigenous Māori population. By the time Aube arrived at the Bay of Islands in June 1840, the acquisition of the country by Britain was effectively complete. Faced with no prospect of anything more than a small colonial settlement, Lavaud left for Banks Peninsula to oversee the arrival of Comte de Paris. Hobson also sent a ship, HMS Britomart, on board which were colonial magistrates.

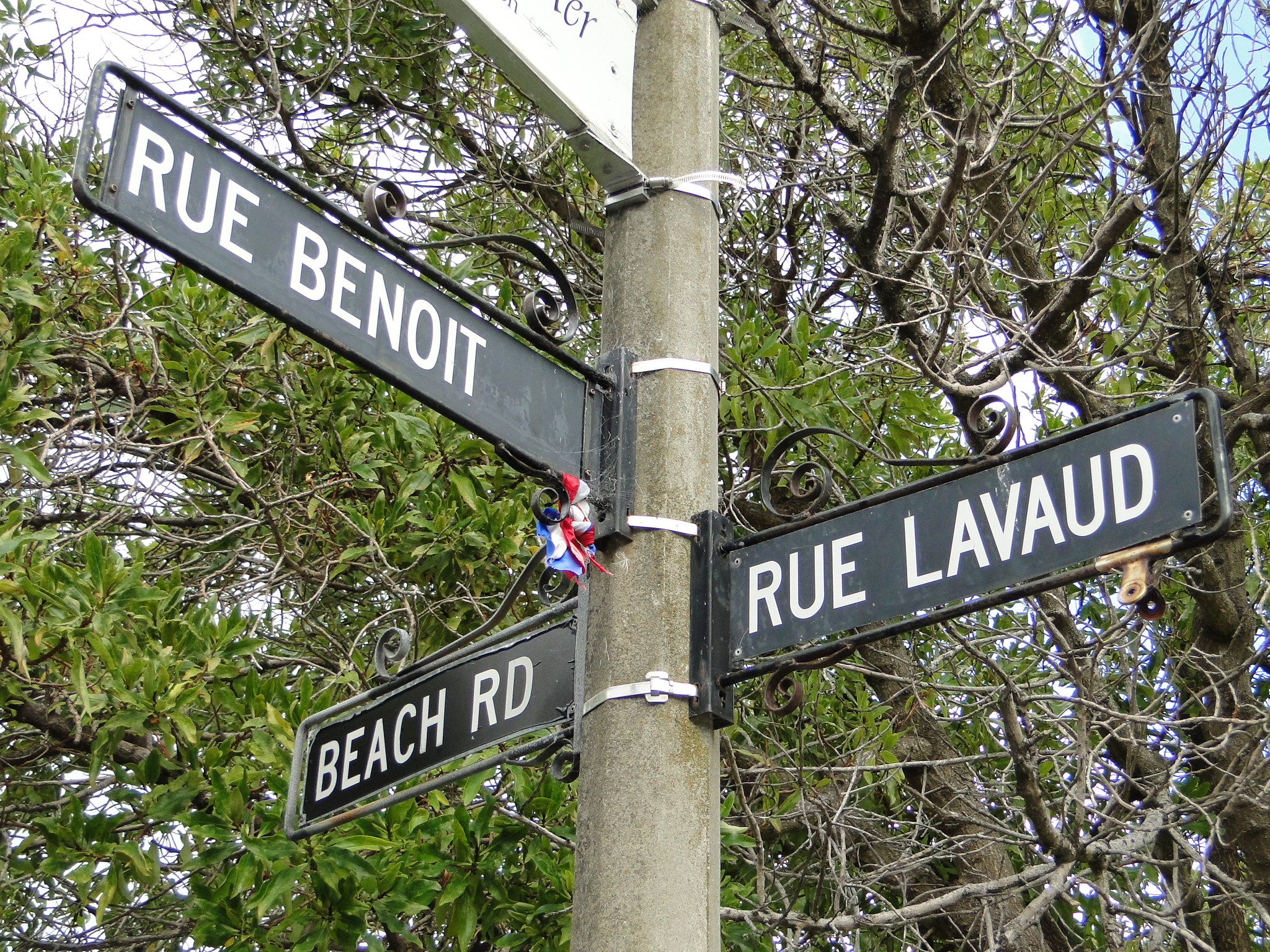
Street names in Akaroa still reflect its French colonial history.

On arriving at Akaroa, Lavaud discovered that the agreement between Langlois and the local Māori was not as clear-cut as had been promised. Despite this, the founding of the colony went ahead, under an amalgam of French and British jurisdiction. C.B. Robinson, one of the magistrates sent on Britomart, worked alongside Lavaud in the organisation of the settlement. Lavaud retired in 1843, and was succeeded as Commissaire du Roi by Post-Captain A. Bérard, who remained in this position until 1846, when formal agreements between the French government and the Nanto-Bordelaise Company settlement ended.

The question of sovereignty remained a complex one, which the local colonial authorities were unable to solve. Eventually, the British Government resolved that the company would be awarded four acres of land for every £1 they could prove to have spent on the settlement. On 30 June 1849, the company's remaining New Zealand properties were bought by the New Zealand Company for the sum of £4,500. A second ship carrying more French settlers, Monarch, arrived at Akaroa in 1850.

Akaroa and the nearby smaller settlement of Duvauchelle both retain a pride in their French history, with many of the local streets having French names. A biennial French festival is held in odd-numbered years in Akaroa.
