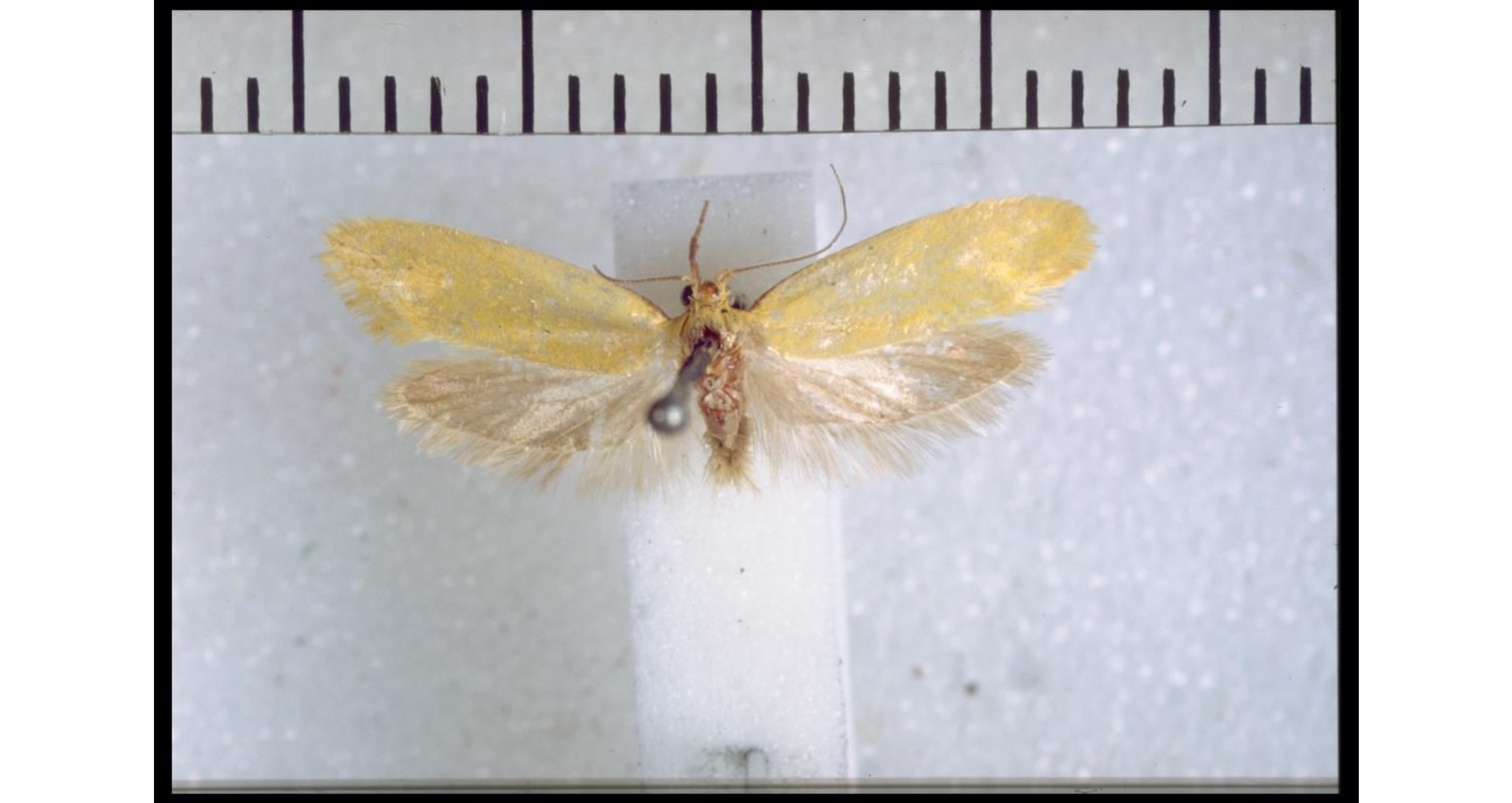
- Male holotype

Scientific classification
- Kingdom: Animalia
- Phylum: Arthropoda
- Class: Insecta
- Order: Lepidoptera
- Family: Oecophoridae
- Genus: Tingena
- Species: T. sinuosa

Binomial name
- Tingena sinuosa (Philpott, 1928)

Synonyms
- Borkhausenia sinuosa Philpott, 1928

= Tingena sinuosa =

Species of moth, endemic to New Zealand

Tingena sinuosa is a species of moth in the family Oecophoridae. It is endemic to New Zealand and has been observed in Wellington and at Tongariro. Adults of this species are on the wing in December.

== Taxonomy ==
This species was first described by Alfred Philpott in 1928 using specimens collected at Wellington Botanic Garden and named Borkhausenia sinuosa. In 1939 George Hudson discussed this species under the name B. sinuosa. In 1988 J. S. Dugdale placed this species within the genus Tingena. The male holotype is held in the New Zealand Arthropod Collection.

== Description ==
Philpott described this species as follows:

♂. 17–19 mm. Head and thorax clear yellow. Palpi yellow, second segment mixed with fuscous without. Antennae greyish-fuscous, ciliations in ♂ ½. Abdomen greyish-white, and tuft ochreous. Legs ochreous-white, anterior pair strongly infuscated. Forewings clongate, costa well arched, apex rounded, termen obliquely rounded; clear yellow; costa at base narrowly edged with brown; fringes concolorous with wing. Hindwings and fringes whitish-grey.

Philpott stated that this species is extremely similar to T. enodis but that it can be distinguished as there are differences in the male genitalia of the two species.

== Distribution ==
This species is endemic to New Zealand and has been observed in Wellington and at Tongariro.

== Behaviour ==
The adults of this species are on the wing in December.
