= William Penlington (teacher) =

New Zealand school principal and educationalist

William Arthur Greener Penlington (8 October 1890 – 5 August 1982) was a New Zealand school principal and educationalist.

Penlington was born at Akaroa on Banks Peninsula, New Zealand in 1890 to an early settler family. His grandfather, William Penlington, was a sawmiller and mayor of Akaroa, and his father—also named William Penlington—was a compositor. Peter Penlington QC and Ross Penlington were sons of two cousins; both were judges.

During World War I he was a captain in the New Zealand Rifle Brigade. After the war his rank was raised temporarily to Major in the resettlement and rehabilitation effort.

He was later head master of Hastings High School, where he was involved in the aftermath of the 1931 Hawke's Bay earthquake.

Penlington played cricket and hockey at a representative level.

== Sources ==
- Boyd, M. B. City of the plains. Wellington, 1984
- Hastings High School jubilee, 1904–1979: Akina 75. [Hastings, 1979]
- Obit. Hawke's Bay Herald-Tribune. 6 August 1982: 4
