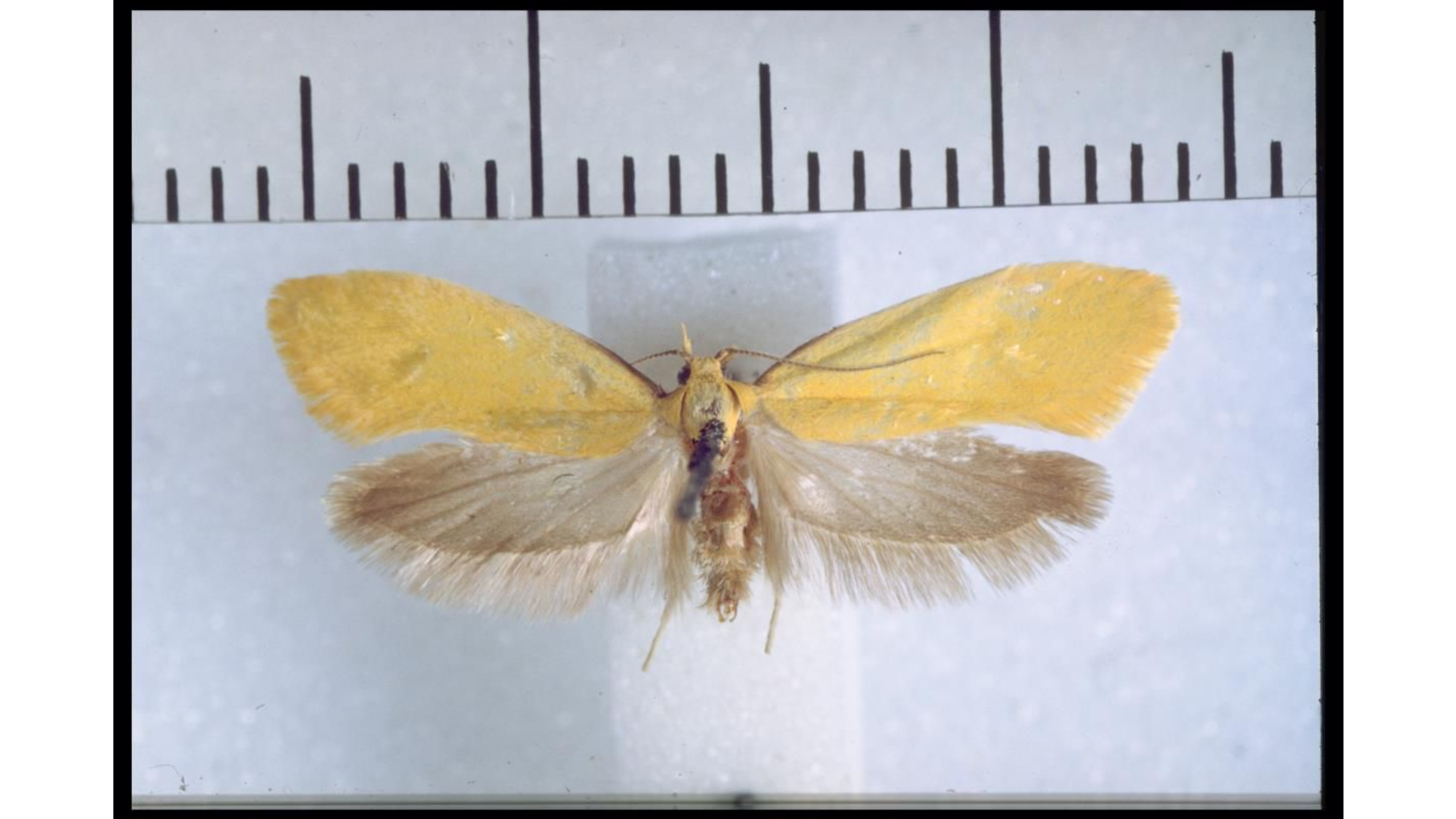
- Male holotype

Scientific classification
- Kingdom: Animalia
- Phylum: Arthropoda
- Class: Insecta
- Order: Lepidoptera
- Family: Oecophoridae
- Genus: Tingena
- Species: T. enodis

Binomial name
- Tingena enodis (Philpott, 1927)

Synonyms
- Borkhausenia enodis Philpott, 1927

= Tingena enodis =

Species of moth, endemic to New Zealand

Tingena enodis is a species of moth in the family Oecophoridae. It is endemic to New Zealand and has been collected in and around Nelson. This species can only be reliably distinguished from its close relatives through the different shape of its male genitalia. As at 1939 a female specimen had yet to be assigned to this species.

== Taxonomy ==
This species was first described by Alfred Philpott in 1927 using a specimen collected at Cawthron Park in Nelson and named the species Borkhausenia enodis. George Hudson discussed this species in his 1939 book A supplement to the butterflies and moths of New Zealand also under this name. In 1988 J. S. Dugdale placed this species in the genus Tingena. The male holotype specimen, collected at Cawthron Park, Nelson, is held in the New Zealand Arthropod Collection.

== Description ==
Philpott described this species as follows:

♂. 19–20 mm. Head, palpi and thorax bright yellow, second segment of palpi, except near apex, fuscous. Antennae ringed alternately with ochreous and fuscous. Abdomen greyish-fuscous. Legs whitish-ochreous, anterior pair infuscated. Forewings, costa well arched, apex bluntly pointed, termen rounded, oblique; bright yellow; costal margin fuscous from base to about ¼; fringes bright yellow. Hindwings pale greyish-fuscous; fringes greyish-fuscous with darker basal line.

This species can be confused with unmarked specimens of Tingena grata but can possibly be distinguished as T. enodis has costa of its forewings that are more arched and it is paler in colour in comparison. However the main difference between these two species are the different shapes of their male genitalia, thus correct identification can only be established by dissection. This species is also very similar to T. sinuosa and can only be distinguished via the shape of the male genitalia.

As at 1939 a female specimen had yet to be assigned to this species.

== Distribution ==
This species is endemic to New Zealand. Other than Cawthron Park, Philpott also collected this species at Cobb Valley as well as other locations in the Nelson region.
