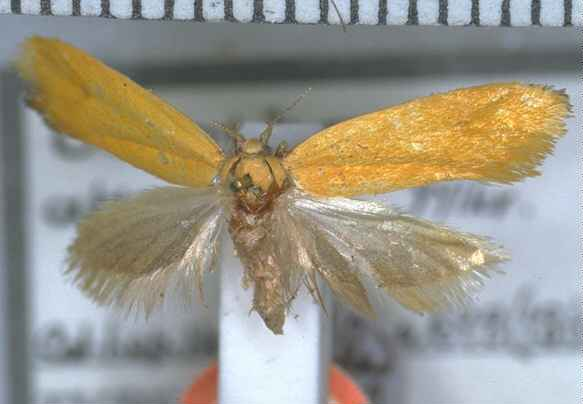
- Female lectotype

Scientific classification
- Kingdom: Animalia
- Phylum: Arthropoda
- Clade: Pancrustacea
- Class: Insecta
- Order: Lepidoptera
- Family: Oecophoridae
- Genus: Tingena
- Species: T. apertella

Binomial name
- Tingena apertella (Walker, 1864)

Synonyms
- Oecophora apertella Walker, 1864; Borkhausenia apertella (Walker, 1864)

= Tingena apertella =

Species of moth, endemic to New Zealand

Tingena apertella is a species of moth in the family Oecophoridae. It is endemic to New Zealand and can be found in both the North and South Islands. Adults are on the wing from November to January and the species is common in beech forests at approximately 2000 ft. At rest on the ground this species appears very similar to a yellow beech leaf.

== Taxonomy ==
This species was first described by Francis Walker in 1864 and named Oecophora apanthes using specimens collected by T. R. Oxley in Nelson. In 1915 Meyrick placed this species within the Borkhausenia genus. George Hudson discussed this species under the name B. apertella in his 1928 publication The butterflies and moths of New Zealand. In 1988 J. S. Dugdale placed this species in the genus Tingena. The female lectotype specimen is held at the Natural History Museum, London.

== Description ==
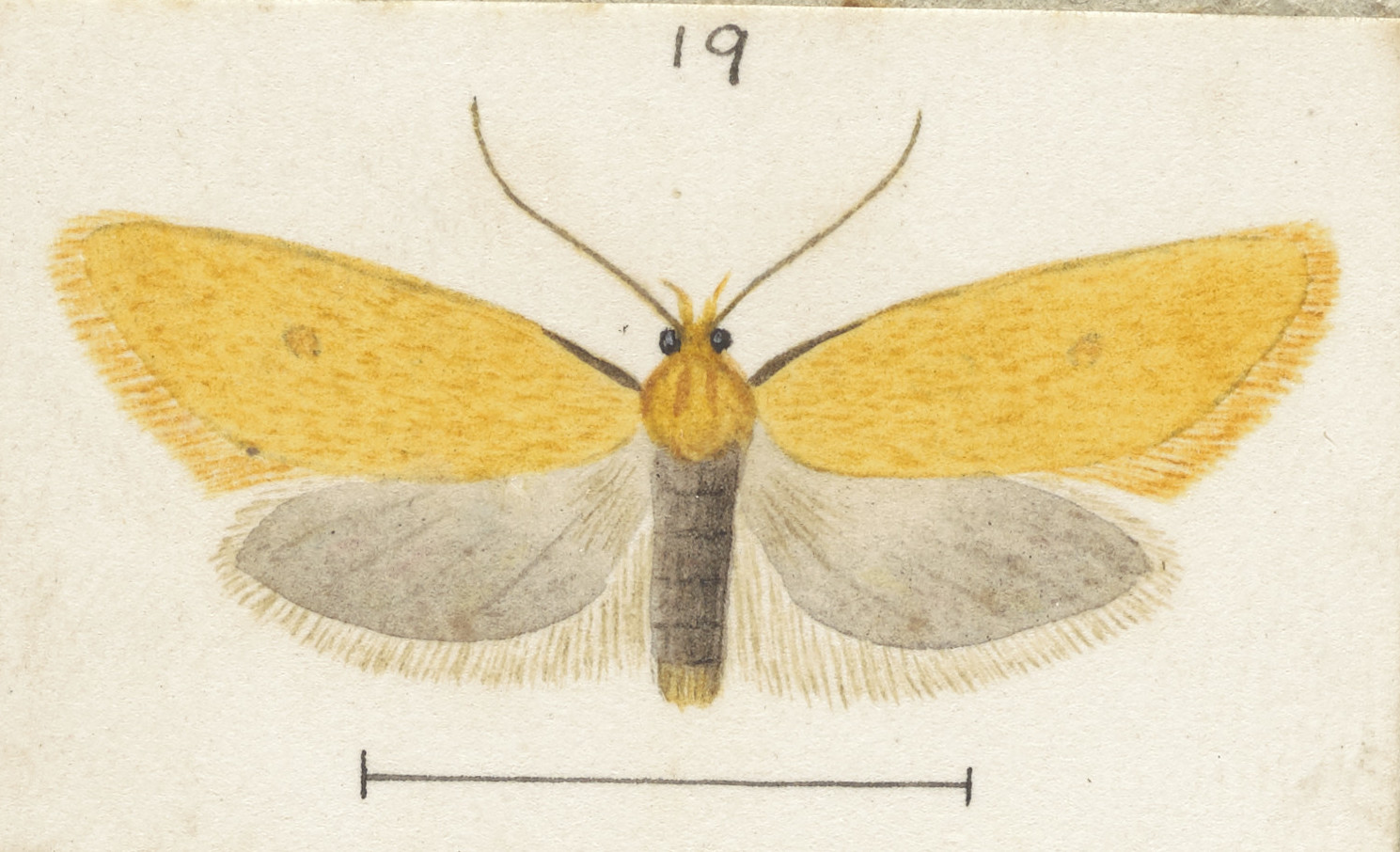
Male T. apertella

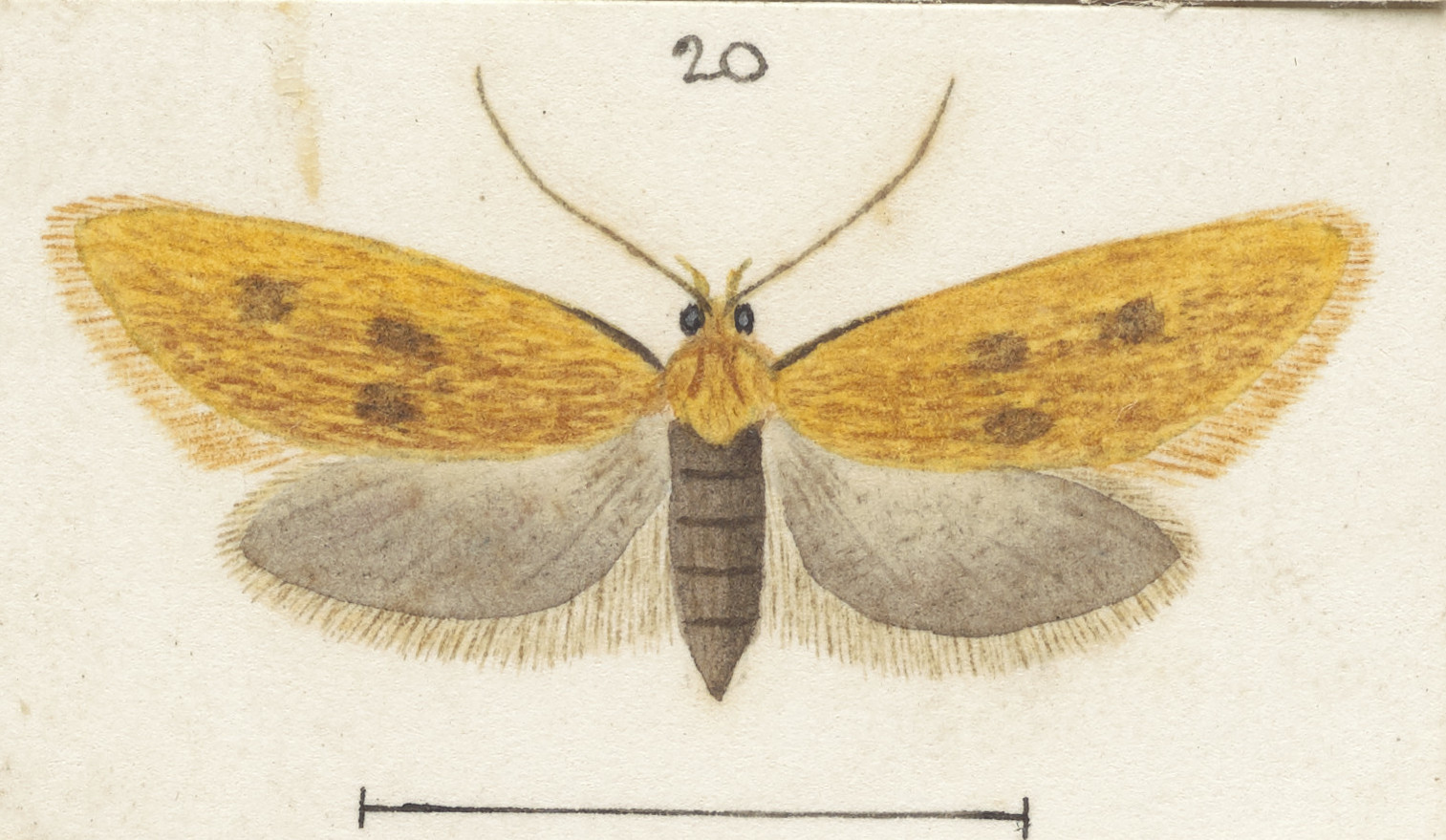
Female T. apertella

Walker described this species as follows:

Female. Golden yellow, sometimes very pale whitish beneath. Palpi slender, twice longer than the breadth of the head; third joint shorter than the second. Abdomen cinereous, extending a little beyond the hind wings. Hind tibiae slightly incrassated. Wings elongate, moderately broad, slightly acute; fringe long. Fore wings with the exterior border very oblique; interior border slightly concave exteriorly. Hind wings cinereous. Length of the body 4 lines; of the wings 12 lines.

Hudson described this species as follows:

The expansion of the wings is about 7/8 inch. The fore-wings are very deep rich yellow, sometimes clouded with orange-brown; there is a fine blackish line along the costa at the base; two discal dots at 1/3, often absent, and one at 2/3, usually very small or absent. The hind-wings are grey.

This species is large in comparison to its close relatives and is very vivid yellow in colour.

== Distribution ==
It is endemic to New Zealand and is found in the North and South Islands. Specimens have been collected in the type locality Nelson, at Mount Ruapehu, in the Wellington region, at Mount Arthur, Castle Hill, Lake Wakatipu, and Invercargill. This species has also been listed as present at Cloud Farm, a site of ecological significance in Akaroa.

== Behaviour ==
The adults of this species are on the wing from November to January. They are attracted to light and have been collected via a mercury vapour light trap.

== Habitat ==
This species has been said to be common in beech forests at around 2000 ft. Hudson states that the species is very similar in appearance to a yellow beech leaf when resting on the ground with closed wings.
