= William Penlington (mayor) =

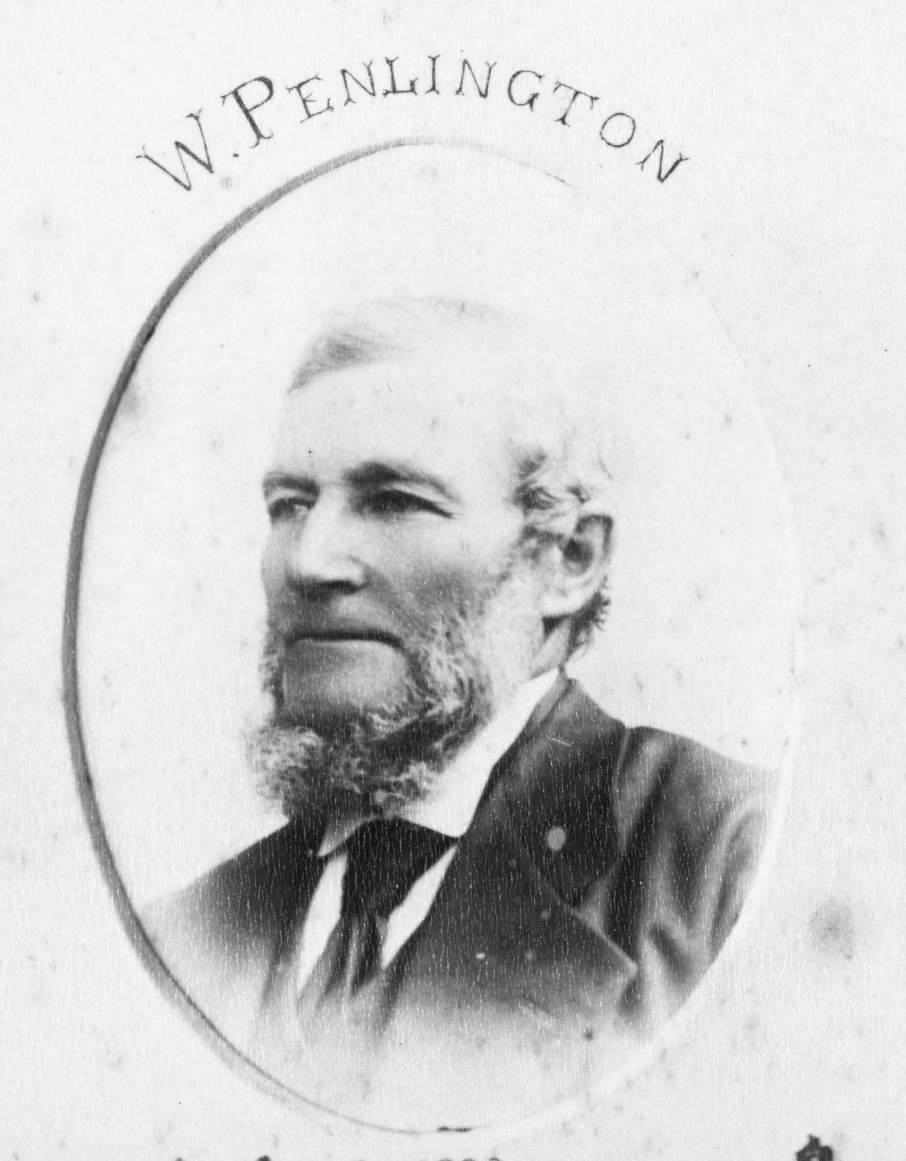
- Penlington ca. 1890

8th Mayor of Akaroa
- In office 19 December 1888 – 16 December 1891
- Preceded by: William Tosswill
- Succeeded by: Herbert Clarke

Personal details
- Born: 1832; Berkshire, England
- Died: 26 October 1899 (aged 66–67); Akaroa, New Zealand

William Penlington (1832 – 26 October 1899) was a sawmiller and builder from Akaroa, New Zealand. A member of the Akaroa Borough Council for over two decades, he was mayor of Akaroa for two terms.

== Early life ==
Penlington was born in Berkshire in 1832. His father was a warehouseman in London. He received a private education and trained as a builder. He arrived in Lyttelton on the Egmont on 23 December 1856, the same ship that brought out Bishop Harper and his family. After travelling through Canterbury and Otago, he settled in Akaroa.

== Professional life and community engagement ==
In Akaroa, Penlington had a sawmill and he was a builder. His notable buildings include the court house, the Oddfellows' Hall, the parsonage of and the transepts for St Peter's Church, the hospital and the school.

Penlington was a member of many organisations. He was active in the Anglican church and was churchwarden for many years. He was elected onto the Akaroa School Committee in February 1867 and was at times the chairman. He was a member of the Hospital Board. He belonged to the Town Hall and the Horticultural committees. He was patron for the Akaroa Boating Club. When the provincial system was disestablished and replaced with borough councils in late 1876, he became one of the Akaroa Borough's first councillors. Apart from one interval, he remained on the borough council for the rest of his life. At the time, local election were held annually towards the end of the year for the next calendar year. Nominations for the mayoralty were due on 19 November 1888 but no-one came forward. And new call for nominations was put out for 28 November 1888 and Penlington was the only candidate; he was thus declared elected unopposed. He was installed as mayor on 19 December 1888. A year later, Penlington was challenged by councillor Lionel Corbett, but the votes were 63 to 19 in the incumbent's favour. In November 1890, Penlington was once again declared elected unopposed. In November 1891, Penlington did not stand again for the mayoralty. He installed his successor, the solicitor Herbert Clarke, on 16 December 1891.

== Family ==
Penlington married Maria Felgate at St Peter's Church on 19 November 1858. They were to have 11 children. Penlington died on 26 October 1899 at his home in Akaroa's Beach Road; he was survived by his wife, six sons, and four daughters. He was buried at Akaroa Cemetery. Their youngest daughter had died in 1892. In 1906, Maria Penlington sold their home on Akaroa's Beach Road to the North Canterbury Education Board (where her son George worked as an architect) and Akaroa School relocated to that site. She moved to Christchurch at that point and died in 1915 at Addington.

The first son of his eldest son, William Penlington, was a notable school principal and the founding head master of Hastings Technical High School (now Hastings Boys' High School). Peter Penlington QC (born 1932), a great-grandson descended from his son George Penlington (1865–1932), is a retired High Court judge. Ross Penlington (1931–2001), who became a Court of Appeal Judge in Hong Kong, is a great-grandson and descended via Benjamin Penlington (1867–1955). In 1902, his son Thomas (1870–1917) married Annie, the only daughter of the late Alexander McGregor.

Political offices
Preceded by William Tosswill	Mayor of Akaroa; 1888–1891	Succeeded by Herbert Clarke
