= Akaroa =

Town in Canterbury, New Zealand

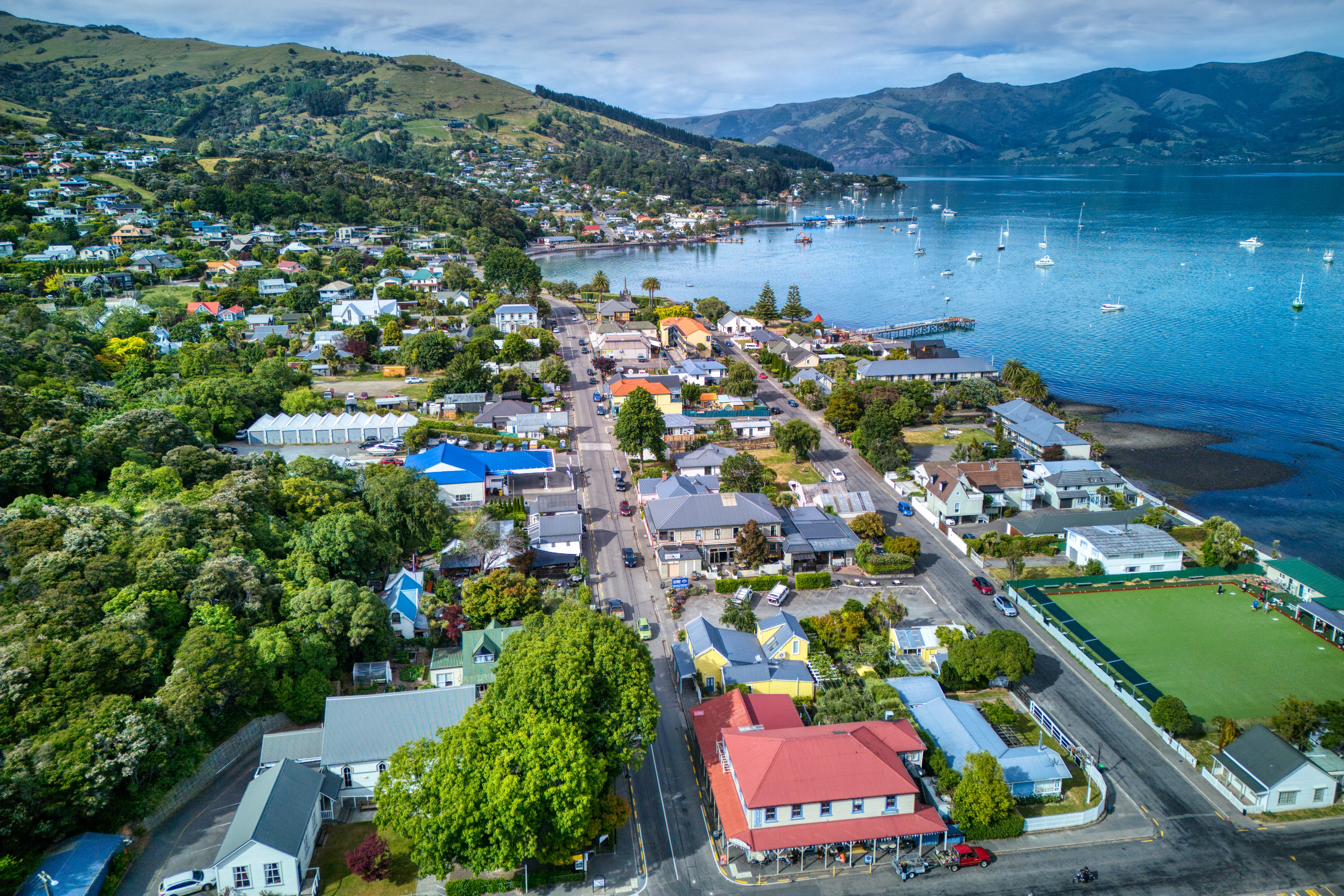
- Akaroa township and main wharf in 2024

- Location of Akaroa in Banks Peninsula
- Coordinates: 43°48′15″S 172°58′00″E
- Country: New Zealand
- Region: Canterbury Region
- District: Christchurch City
- Ward: Banks Peninsula
- Community: Te Pātaka o Rākaihautū Banks Peninsula
- European settlement: 18 August 1840
- Founder: Jean François Langlois
- Electorates: Banks Peninsula; Te Tai Tonga (Māori)

Government
  - Territorial Authority: Christchurch City Council
  - Regional council: Environment Canterbury
  - Mayor of Christchurch: Phil Mauger
  - Banks Peninsula MP: Tracey McLellan
  - Te Tai Tonga MP: Mananui Ramsden

Area
  - Total: 2.03 km^{2} (0.78 sq mi)

Population (June 2025)
  - Total: 640
  - Density: 320/km^{2} (820/sq mi)
- Postcode: 7520
- Local iwi: Ngāi Tahu

Akaroa is a small town on Banks Peninsula in the Canterbury Region of the South Island of New Zealand, situated within a harbour of the same name. The name Akaroa is Kāi Tahu Māori for "Long Harbour", which would be spelled Whangaroa in standard Māori. The area was also named Port Louis-Philippe by French settlers after the reigning French king Louis Philippe I.

The town is 84 kilometres (52 mi) by road from Christchurch and is the terminus of State Highway 75. It is set on a sheltered harbour and is overlooked and surrounded by the remnants of an eruptive centre of the Miocene Banks Peninsula Volcano.

== History ==
In 1830, the Māori settlement at Takapūneke, east of the current town of Akaroa, was the scene of a notorious incident. The captain of the British brig Elizabeth, John Stewart, helped North Island Ngāti Toa chief, Te Rauparaha, to capture the local Kāi Tahu chief, Tama-i-hara-nui, his wife Te Whe and his young daughter, Roimata. The settlement of Takapūneke was sacked. There were an estimated 400 Kāi Tahu in the pā and most were killed, with only the strongest taken as slaves. Stewart could not be convicted of murder owing to the lack of a suitable legal system in New Zealand at the time. This incident was one of several lawless acts committed by Stewart around this time. The actions of John Stewart were examples of other incidents of lawlessness among Europeans in New Zealand, which contributed to the appointment of an official British Resident, James Busby, to New Zealand in 1832.

The sparse population was further reduced in 1832, when Te Rauparaha, fresh from his successful three-month siege of Kaiapoi Pā, took the pā on Ōnawe Peninsula at the head of Akaroa Harbour.

The earliest European settlers used Akaroa as a whaling base. Akaroa is now one of the few whaling bases in New Zealand that still exists as a town.

=== French settlement ===
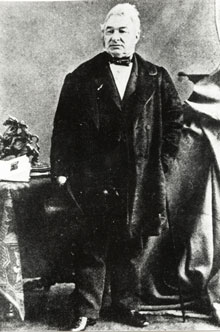
Charles François Lavaud (1798–1878)

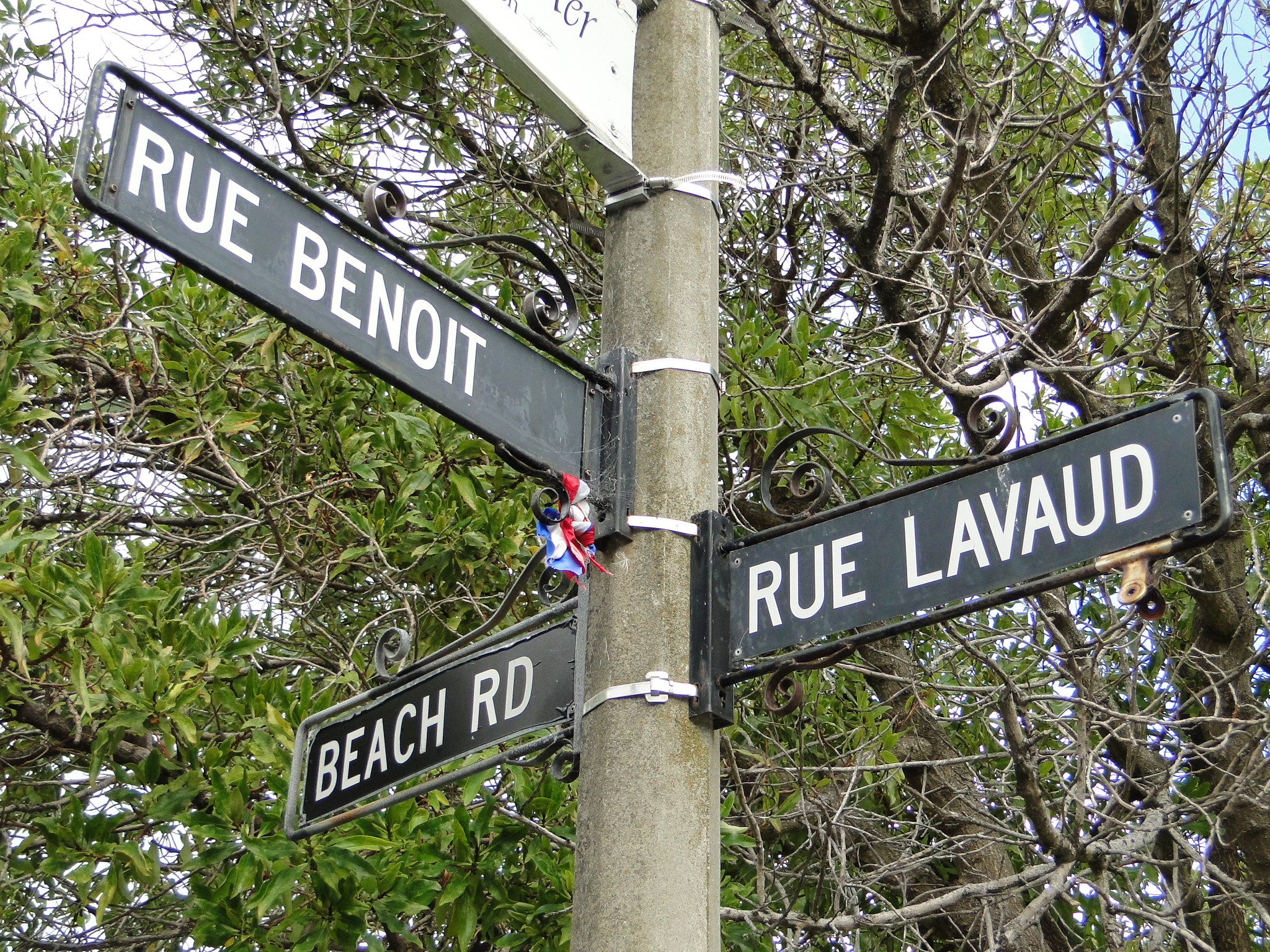
An Akaroa street sign showing French-language street names

In the 1830s, France developed extensive plans for colonial expansion, including into the Pacific where at that time it had no colonies. The plans included the South Island of New Zealand. The tiny settlement established at Akaroa can be viewed in the context of that failed, wider project. In 1838, a whaler, Captain Jean François Langlois, wrote up a questionable deed of purchase for "the greater Banks Peninsula" to which twelve Kāi Tahu chiefs each added their moko or cross. The price was 1,000 francs (£40), with a deposit of 150 francs (£6) paid in goods (Note: According to the Deed of Purchase, the goods equivalent to the 150 francs deposit were one woollen overcoat, six pairs of cloth trousers, 12 oilskin hats, two pairs of shoes, a pistol, two pairs of red woollen shirts and one oilskin coat.) and the remainder to be paid upon Langlois' return from France with settlers. When the settlers later did arrive, the British authorities – who had in the meantime taken possession of the whole of New Zealand – decided a valid sale had not taken place in 1838, relying for their decision on English law and Māori oral evidence.

While back in France, Langlois had raised capital from wealthy businessmen to fund the planned whaling and colonising venture. The Nanto-Bordelaise Company was set up, with the major shareholder being Adolphe Balguerie. Langlois ceded his supposed Banks Peninsula title to the company, took a minor shareholding and was entrusted with the whaling side of the venture.

The company is comparable to the British "New Zealand Association" (later a company) but unlike the British, who arranged for all land sold by the indigenous Māori to go through its government representative, the French government planned to have Māori land sales arranged through the company. The model treaties for land acquisition sent out from France can be compared with the Treaty of Waitangi, used by the British as their way of acquiring Māori land. The French government became involved and in order to send out the settlers it supplied the warship, Mahé, fitted out as a whaler and renamed Comte de Paris. On 9 March 1840, 63 emigrants left Rochefort. They were accompanied by the Aube, a 28-gun corvette under Commodore Charles-François Lavaud, whose role was also to oversee French whaling interests around New Zealand.

The ships arrived in the Bay of Islands in the North Island on 11 July 1840, where they learned that during their voyage William Hobson had proclaimed British sovereignty over all New Zealand on 21 May, and that the main South Island Māori chiefs had signed the Treaty of Waitangi. Hobson, who was now lieutenant-governor, wanted there to be no doubt that British sovereignty extended over all New Zealand and so to counter any potential threat to that situation, he dispatched the brig-sloop, HMS Britomart, to call first at Port Nicholson where the New Zealand Company settlers had recently arrived and established their own fledgling government, and thence to Akaroa. Once there, Britomart and fluttering Union Jacks would provide a less than subtle welcome for the soon to arrive French settlers and quash any sovereignty pretentions Lavaud might have had. Back in the Bay of Islands, while discussions on land rights took place, the French colonisation continued. On 18 August 1840, the settlement at Akaroa began, with 57 settlers including 12 Germans. (Some had died en route.) The settlers' land was around German Bay (Takamatua), (Note: It was renamed during the First World War due to anti-German sentiment.) French Town (Akaroa) and the hill behind. For the first six years, the settlers were outnumbered by a large contingent of French sailors and naval officers. They were all part of a sizeable infrastructure that included Catholic missionaries, churches, and priests taking classes. In addition, there was a French mayor, French doctors in a French hospital and a French store. There were also French by-laws and a French court of justice. Bishop Pompallier established his first European station in Akaroa in 1840 as the French immigrants were all nominally Catholic. However, he closed the station in disgust, due to the religious apathy of the French immigrants. The area still shows a French influence, prominent in many local place names. It is the oldest town in Canterbury and one of the most historic places in New Zealand.

Meanwhile, the British dismissed the Nanto-Bordelaise Company's claim as it was not based on British law, but only after extensive and complex negotiations had taken place with Māori and the French, represented by Commadore Lavaud and the company's urbane agent, Pierre-Joseph de Belligny. Land ownership discussions dragged on until 1849, and by then both governments back in Europe had become involved. Given that the French colonists had set out for New Zealand on the assumption that they owned the land, Lord Stanley, of the Colonial Office, instructed the New Zealand authorities in 1845 to grant 30,000 acres to the Nanto-Bordelaise Company. This grant never actually happened at that time and the 30,000 acres were never clearly defined, but all concerned acted as if the company now owned that land. The company by then was in a dire financial position and was keen to raise funds by selling that land, which it did before becoming insolvent in 1849. Some land was sold to individual settlers but most was bought by the New Zealand Company, which had still not decided on a place in the area to establish its own settlement. To the indignation of Langlois, the Nanto-Bordelaise Company had sold all its remaining land on the peninsula for £4,500. So by 1849, the French settlers were on their own in a British colony.

Before 1840, the area of the current Akaroa town was also known as Wangaloa. The French at first called their settlement Port Louis-Philippe in honour of Louis Philippe I, who reigned as King of the French from 1830 to 1848.

=== British settlement ===
After being informed of the French intention to colonise Akaroa and to further its use as a whaling port, the Lieutenant-Governor of New Zealand, Captain William Hobson, sent the ship HMS Britomart to proclaim sovereignty over the area for the British Crown. HMS Britomart arrived in Akaroa on 16 August 1840, although the captain's log shows the arrival date as 11 August. Captain Stanley raised the British flag, and held a court at each of the occupied settlements, to convince the French that the area was indeed under British control. A monument at the eastern edge of the town commemorates the British arrival.

James Robinson Clough, also known as Jimmy Robinson, had arrived at Akaroa several years before. He acted as interpreter for Captain Owen Stanley at the flag-raising of 1840, and was the first European to travel up the Avon River / Ōtākaro in 1843. Clough's descendants are still prominent on the Peninsula today.

British immigrants settled in both Akaroa and German Bay (Takamatua), along with many German farmers, who set up dairy, sheep and cocksfoot (Dactylis glomerata) farms. The great majority of the artefacts currently held at Akaroa Museum are of the early farming community and their way of life at the time.

Arriving from England in April 1850, the Monarch, needing repairs, sailed into Akaroa Harbour. It was bound for Auckland however forty of the passengers decided to stay in Akaroa. The British immigrants settled at the southern end of Akaroa with the French living at the northern end with a small bay separating the two.

Akaroa was described in 1854 as “altogether very like a small seaside village in England”. In 1878, there were only ten French born residents in the town of Akaroa out of a population of 642 people. A further 27 French born people lived outside the town boundaries.

Businesses grew in Akaroa and by 1883 there were five builders, four confectioners, eight general stores, five milk-sellers, four shoemakers, two bankers, five milliners and five blacksmiths.

Daly's wharf was built between 1863 and 1865 and refurbished in 1914. Located at the end of Rue Balguerie, it has been used by coastal ships and fishing boats. At the end of the wharf, an octagonal building with a turret roof was built by 1932.

Akaroa was described as a “long favourite holiday haven not only for New Zealanders but visitors from Australia and the Old World” in 1903. At this time, most of Akaroa was concentrated around the waterfront with only a few houses built on the hillsides. The population living in Akaroa was 559 people with a total of 124 houses in 1901.

The main wharf at Akaroa was built in 1887. Plans were made in 2022 to rebuild the main wharf in the same position that it currently is, as it was nearing the end of its useable life. The rebuild is expected to cost $19.1 million and be completed by 30 June 2025.

== Demographics ==
Akaroa is described by Stats NZ as a rural settlement, and covers 2.03 km^{2} (0.78 sq mi). It had an estimated population of 640 as of June 2025, with a population density of 315 people per km^{2}.

Historical population
Year	Pop.	±% p.a.
2006	591	—
2013	645	+1.26%
2018	756	+3.23%
2023	636	−3.40%

Akaroa had a population of 636 in the 2023 New Zealand census, a decrease of 120 people (−15.9%) since the 2018 census, and a decrease of 9 people (−1.4%) since the 2013 census. There were 300 males and 336 females in 336 dwellings. 2.4% of people identified as LGBTIQ+. The median age was 58.3 years (compared with 38.1 years nationally). There were 60 people (9.4%) aged under 15 years, 57 (9.0%) aged 15 to 29, 261 (41.0%) aged 30 to 64, and 255 (40.1%) aged 65 or older.

People could identify as more than one ethnicity. The results were 89.6% European (Pākehā); 9.0% Māori; 1.4% Pasifika; 5.7% Asian; 0.5% Middle Eastern, Latin American and African New Zealanders (MELAA); and 1.4% other, which includes people giving their ethnicity as "New Zealander". English was spoken by 98.1%, Māori by 1.9%, and other languages by 13.2%. No language could be spoken by 0.9% (e.g. too young to talk). The percentage of people born overseas was 25.9, compared with 28.8% nationally.

Religious affiliations were 37.7% Christian, 1.9% Hindu, 0.9% Māori religious beliefs, 1.4% Buddhist, and 2.4% other religions. People who answered that they had no religion were 49.1%, and 6.6% of people did not answer the census question.

Of those at least 15 years old, 144 (25.0%) people had a bachelor's or higher degree, 309 (53.6%) had a post-high school certificate or diploma, and 129 (22.4%) people exclusively held high school qualifications. The median income was $36,900, compared with $41,500 nationally. 42 people (7.3%) earned over $100,000 compared to 12.1% nationally. The employment status of those at least 15 was 225 (39.1%) full-time, 102 (17.7%) part-time, and 12 (2.1%) unemployed.

== Tourism ==
Akaroa is a popular resort town. Many Hector's dolphins can be found within the harbour, and in the area of the Akaroa Marine Reserve at the harbour entrance. 'Swim with the dolphins' boat tours are a major tourist attraction. Akaroa became a popular cruise ship destination after the 2011 Canterbury Earthquakes damaged the port of Lyttelton. In the summer of 2009–10, Akaroa was visited by seven cruise ships. This increased to ninety cruise ships in 2019 and 2020. The numbers reduced to 19 cruise ships in 2022 with the opening of Lyttelton cruise ship berth.

== Education ==
Akaroa's first primary school opened in 1857, and the first high school followed in 1883. The high school was for boys only in the first year but became co-educational in the second year. However, in 1900 it closed due to a lack of paying students. The next year, it re-opened as a free District High School. It moved to the current site in 1935. In 2007, the primary school was merged with it to form Akaroa Area School. This is now a co-educational composite school covering years 1 to 13, with a roll of 115 as of July 2026.

== Museum ==
Akaroa Museum first opened in 1964, and concentrates on the history of Akaroa and Banks Peninsula. It is located at 71 Rue Lavaud and includes within the museum complex the 1878 court house and the 1840s Langlois-Eteveneaux cottage next to it, and the 1850s customs house further down Rue Balguerie. In 2023, the museum put on an exhibition called Catching Shadows which displayed a photographic history of Banks Peninsula starting in the early 1840s.

== Akaroa lighthouse ==
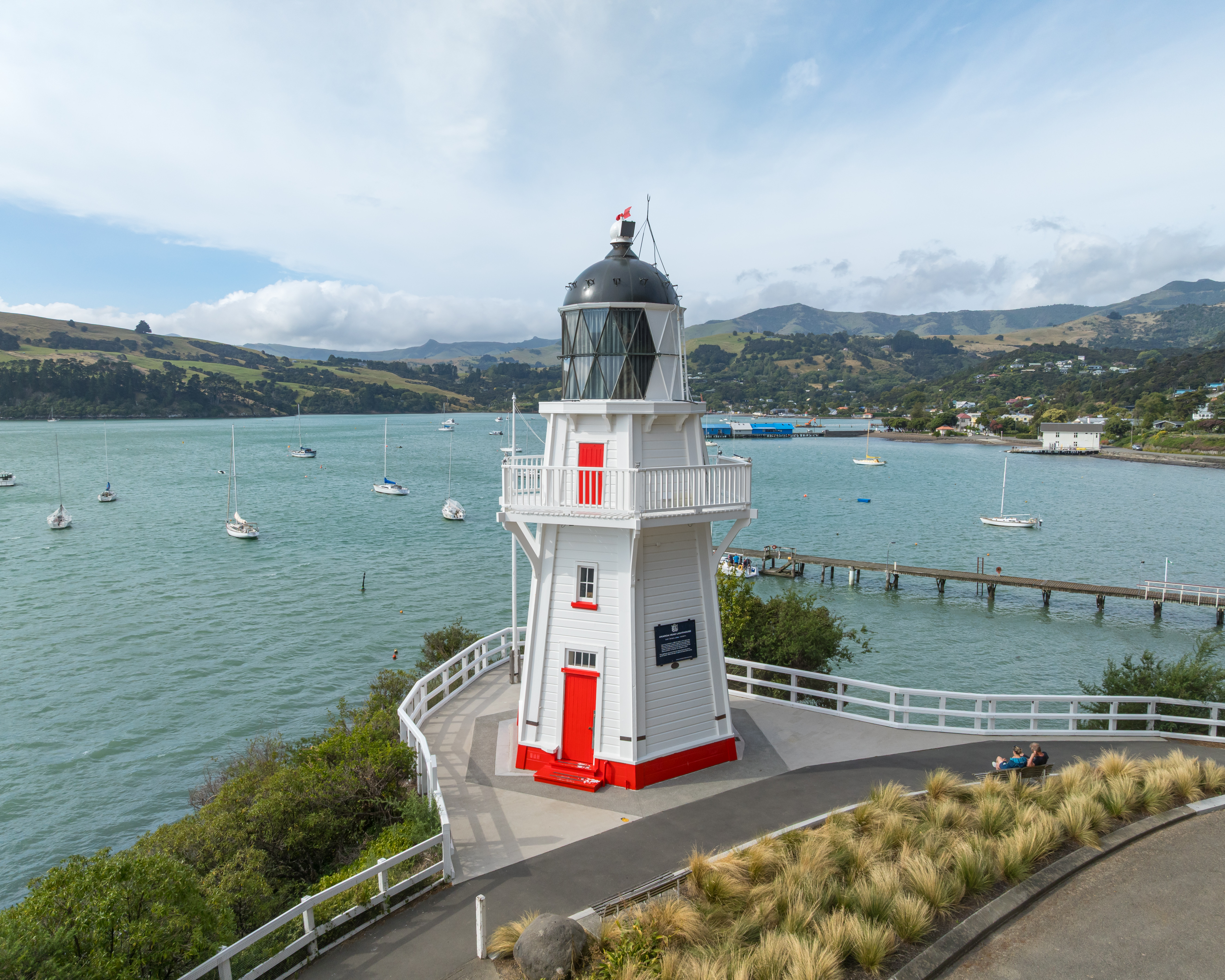
Akaroa lighthouse in 2025

The Akaroa lighthouse has sat at Cemetery Point in the township since 1980. For the 100 years prior to that, it was located 82 m (270 ft) above sea level on a headland at Akaroa heads. The original site was chosen in 1875. In 1877, the lens and mount were ordered from France and the mechanism from Scotland. The road to the lighthouse had to be blasted out of solid rock and took ten months to complete. Construction of the lighthouse finally began in 1879. Unfortunately, a southerly storm demolished the framework completely and work had to start again from scratch, this time with a stronger design. The 8.5 m (28 ft) tall light house was completed in 1880 and when operating, its light could be seen 37 km (23 mi) away. A telephone was installed in the lighthouse in 1885, and a kerosene generator was installed in 1935, allowing the light to be automated. This was converted to diesel in 1951. In 1977 a new automatic lighthouse was built to replace the original staffed lighthouse. In 1980, the original lighthouse was moved in pieces and then reassembled in its current position in the town of Akaroa. The Akaroa lighthouse is open for viewing on Sundays and on days when cruise ships visit the town.

== Churches ==
=== Onuku Church ===
Onuku Church is a historic undenomnational church located in The Kaik, near Akaroa. This church had its foundation stone laid in November 1876 and was completed in 1878. It is located at the Ōnuku marae. Built out of timber with a pitched shingle roof, it has a bell turret and room for 60 parishioners. After falling into disrepair around 1939, work was completed to restore the church and add traditional carved panels to the porch. Services were held regularly until 1963.

=== Saint Patrick's Catholic church ===
This was the third Catholic church to be built in Akaroa, replacing the two earlier churches. It was designed by Christchurch architects Benjamin Mountfort and Maxwell Bury and built in 1865 out of timber. A porch was added in 1886 and a bell tower in 1893. A stained glass window depicting the crucifixion was added in 1930.

=== Saint Peter's Anglican church ===
Saint Peter's Anglican church was built out of timber in the Gothic revival style and was completed in 1863. It replaced the previous Anglican church which was built eleven years earlier in 1852. A pipe organ was added in 1869. Benjamin Mountfort designed the transepts and chancel in 1877.

=== Trinity Presbyterian church ===
The Trinity Presbyterian church was completed in 1886, thirty years after the first Presbyterian services were held in a private home. Built in the Gothic revival style with a steep roof, it was designed by Christchurch architect, John Whitelaw. In 1912, a church hall was added. It was listed by Heritage New Zealand as a category two historic place in 1990.

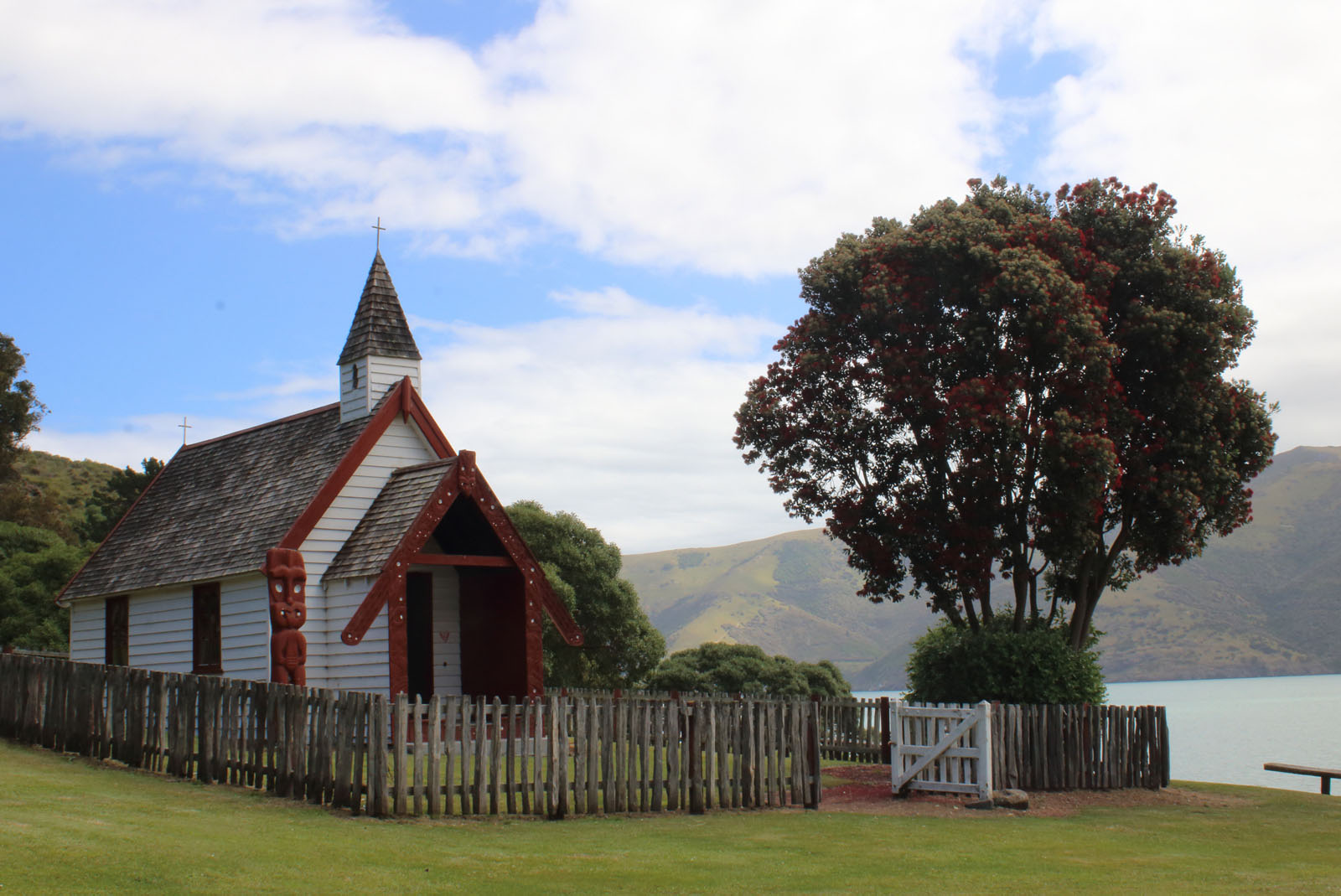
Ōnuku church

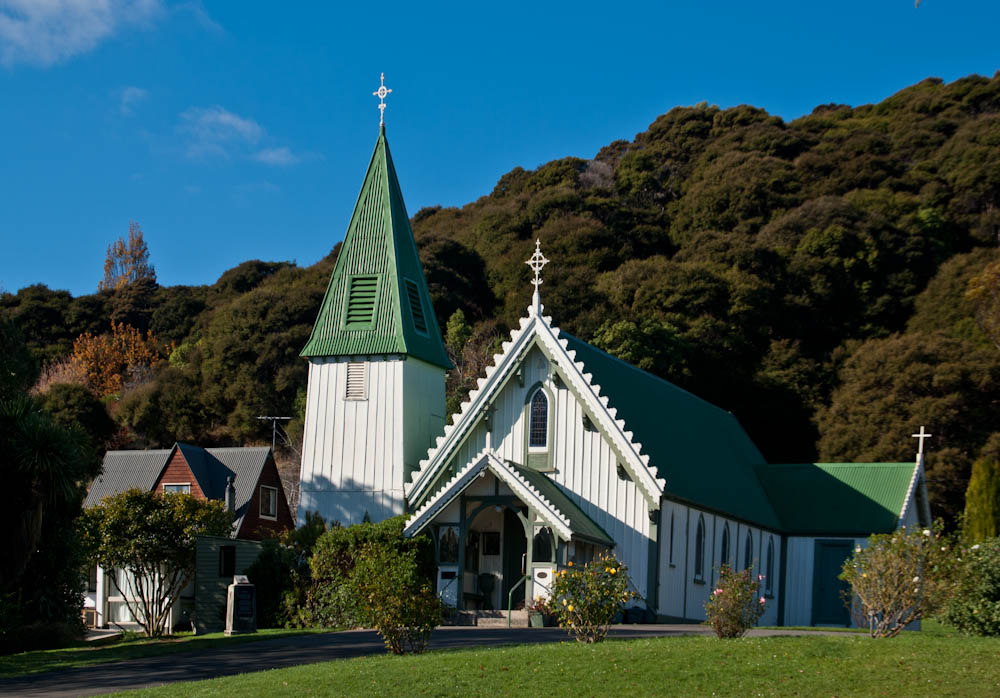
Saint Patrick's Catholic church

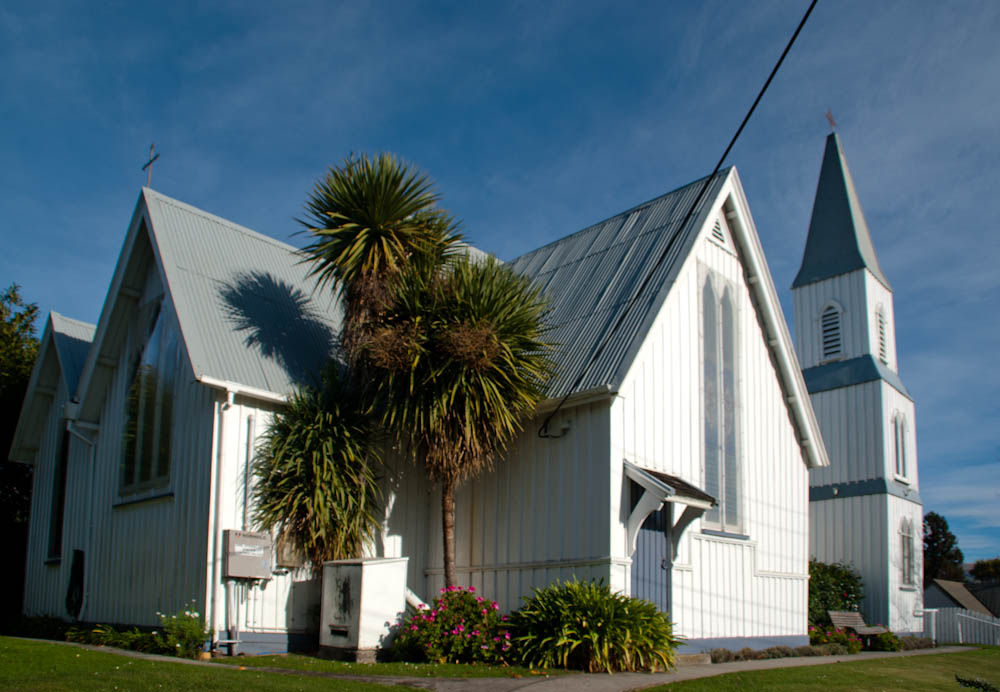
Saint Peter's Anglican church

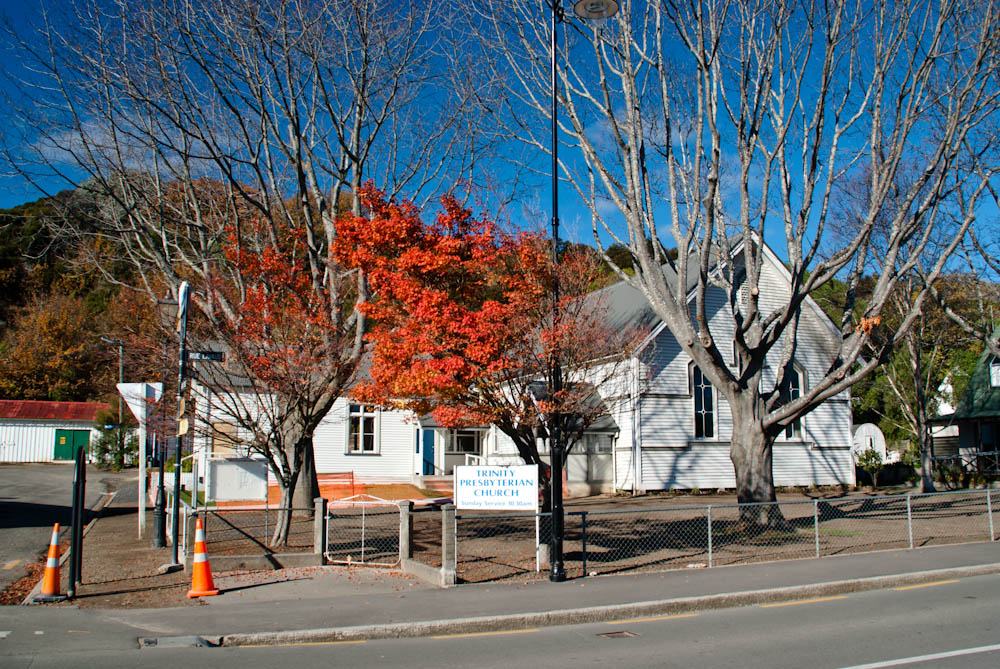
Trinity Presbyterian church

== Utilities ==
A water supply scheme in Akaroa provides drinking water for around 1000 properties in the Akaroa township, and a further 130 properties in Takamatua. Water is sourced from four streams and two wells, and is treated at the L'Aube Hill water treatment plant. The waste water treatment plant and harbour outfall is located at Takapūneke.

== Climate ==
Climate data for Akaroa (1991–2020 normals, extremes 1979–present)
Month	Jan	Feb	Mar	Apr	May	Jun	Jul	Aug	Sep	Oct	Nov	Dec	Year
Record high °C (°F)	38.0 (100.4)	35.5 (95.9)	35.5 (95.9)	30.0 (86.0)	27.0 (80.6)	23.0 (73.4)	21.6 (70.9)	23.0 (73.4)	26.8 (80.2)	32.0 (89.6)	31.1 (88.0)	35.0 (95.0)	38.0 (100.4)
Mean daily maximum °C (°F)	22.7 (72.9)	22.4 (72.3)	20.6 (69.1)	17.6 (63.7)	15.3 (59.5)	12.6 (54.7)	12.0 (53.6)	13.2 (55.8)	15.4 (59.7)	17.5 (63.5)	19.2 (66.6)	21.3 (70.3)	17.5 (63.5)
Daily mean °C (°F)	17.5 (63.5)	17.2 (63.0)	15.6 (60.1)	13.0 (55.4)	10.8 (51.4)	8.3 (46.9)	7.6 (45.7)	8.7 (47.7)	10.6 (51.1)	12.3 (54.1)	14.0 (57.2)	16.2 (61.2)	12.6 (54.8)
Mean daily minimum °C (°F)	12.4 (54.3)	12.1 (53.8)	10.7 (51.3)	8.4 (47.1)	6.2 (43.2)	4.0 (39.2)	3.3 (37.9)	4.2 (39.6)	5.6 (42.1)	7.1 (44.8)	8.8 (47.8)	11.1 (52.0)	7.8 (46.1)
Record low °C (°F)	4.5 (40.1)	4.4 (39.9)	0.5 (32.9)	0.0 (32.0)	−5.0 (23.0)	−5.5 (22.1)	−3.0 (26.6)	−3.5 (25.7)	−3.0 (26.6)	−2.3 (27.9)	1.0 (33.8)	2.5 (36.5)	−5.5 (22.1)
Average rainfall mm (inches)	46.9 (1.85)	55.1 (2.17)	86.4 (3.40)	72.0 (2.83)	74.1 (2.92)	107.2 (4.22)	159.5 (6.28)	124.7 (4.91)	66.6 (2.62)	79.8 (3.14)	70.7 (2.78)	67.5 (2.66)	1,010.5 (39.78)
Mean monthly sunshine hours	244.8	210.9	189.3	152.6	129.6	96.0	115.2	140.6	182.8	219.7	237.2	242.2	2,160.9
Mean daily daylight hours	15.0	13.8	12.4	10.9	9.6	9.0	9.3	10.4	11.8	13.3	14.6	15.4	12.1
Percentage possible sunshine	53	54	49	47	44	36	40	44	52	53	54	51	48
Source 1: NIWA (rainfall 1971–2000)
Source 2: Weather Spark

== Notable residents ==
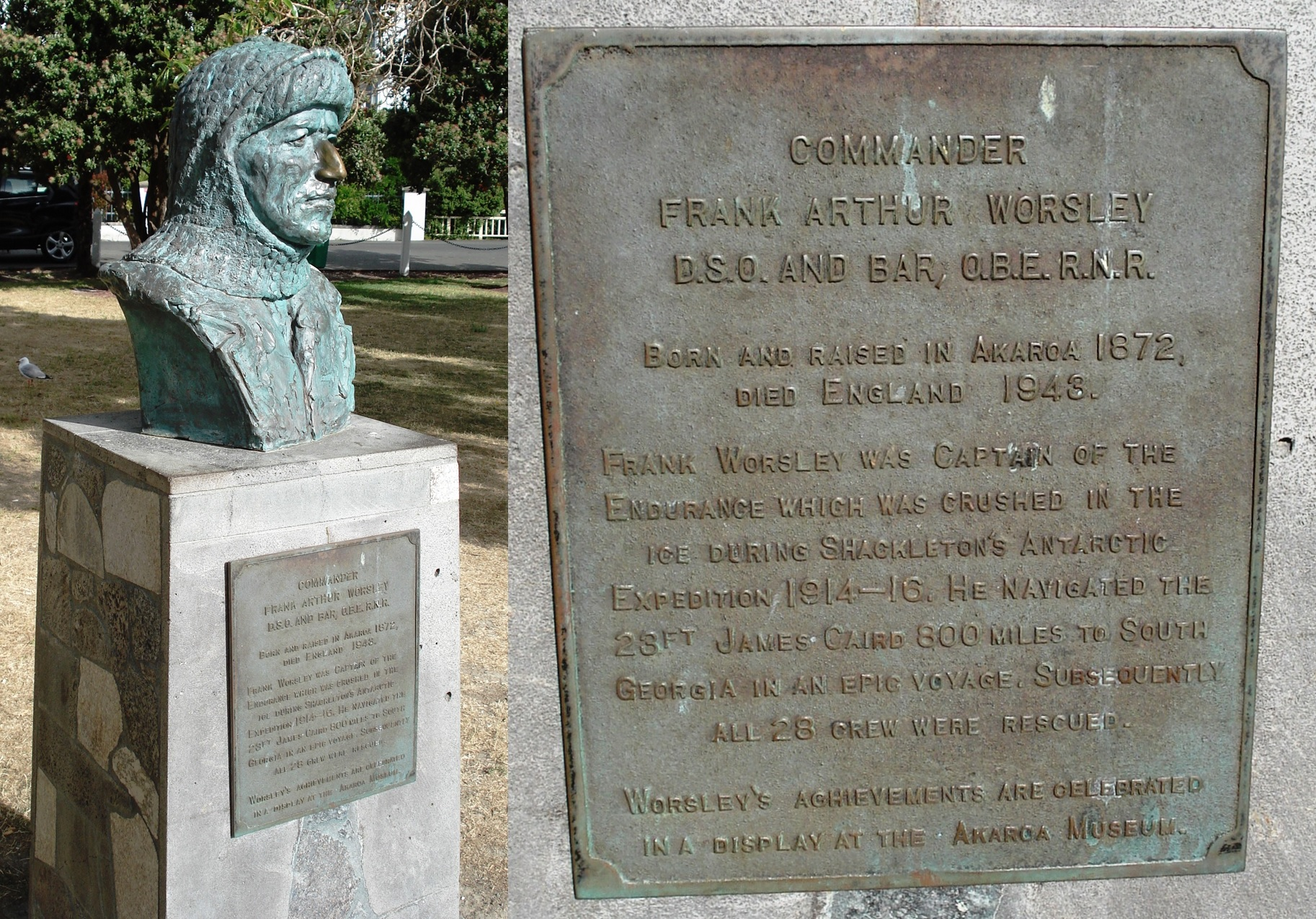
A bronze bust of Frank Worsley located in the Britomart Reserve, on the foreshore

- Jessie Buckland (1878–1939), photographer
- John Buckland (1844–1909), politician
- Bob Parker (born 1953), former mayor of Banks Peninsula and former resident
- William Penlington (1832–1899), sawmiller, builder and mayor of Akaroa
- William Penlington (1890–1982), school principal and educationalist
- Hugh Wilson (born 1945), botanist living at Hinewai Reserve over the hill from Akaroa
- Frank Worsley (1872–1943), sailor and explorer who served on Ernest Shackleton's Imperial Trans-Antarctic Expedition of 1914–1916, as captain of the Endurance

== Sources ==
- Ogilvie, Gordon (2010). Banks Peninsula : Cradle of Canterbury (3rd ed.). Phillips & King Publishers. ISBN 978-0-9583315-7-9.
- The Royal Society of New Zealand (February 1958). New Zealand Journal of Geology and Geophysics. The Royal Society of New Zealand. p. 207.
- Tremewan, Peter (2010). French Akaroa (2nd ed.). CUP. ISBN 978-1-877257-97-1.
