= Peter Penlington =

New Zealand layer and judge (1932–2025)

Peter George Spenser Penlington CNZM KC (13 December 1932 – 31 January 2025) was a New Zealand lawyer and judge. He was appointed Queen's Counsel in 1978, and served as High Court judge from 1990 until 2000.

== Early life and education ==
Penlington was born in Christchurch on 13 December 1932. His parents were Spenser Penlington and Marjorie Ethel Penlington (née Frostick). His great-grandfather, William Penlington, was mayor of Akaroa in the 1880s. He received his education at St Albans Primary School, Christ's College (1946–1950), and the University of Canterbury. He graduated with a Bachelor of Laws in 1956 and was admitted as a barrister and solicitor the same year.

Penlington married Gillian Beatrix Ramsden in 1960. They had two sons and one daughter. Ross Penlington (1931–2001), who was a Court of Appeal Judge in Hong Kong, was a second cousin.

== Legal career ==
=== Civil law ===
Penlington started work as a clerk for R. A. Young Hunter & Co in 1951. In the following year, he moved to Wynn Williams & Co as a law clerk. In 1957, he returned to R. A. Young Hunter & Co, becoming a partner in 1959. He left in 1977 to set up his own practice. In 1990, he was appointed judge of the High Court.

He held membership of the prosecutors panel from 1968 to 1990. In 1974/75, he was president of the Law Society's Canterbury district. He served on the national council of the Law Society from 1972 to 1974.

=== Military law ===
From 1956 to 1962, Penlington was with the Territorial Force and attained the rank of lieutenant. From 1968 to 1983, he was judge-advocate. From 1983 to 1990, he served as judge of the court-martial appeal court.

=== Publications ===
Together with Judge Anthony Willy, Penlington published the legal textbook Penlington and Willy High Court forms in 1985.

== Later life and death ==
In his latter years, Penlington lived at a retirement village in the Christchurch suburb of Russley, and he died there on 31 January 2025, at the age of 92.

== Honours and awards ==
On 18 December 1978, Penlington was appointed Queen's Counsel. On his retirement as a permanent judge of the High Court on 10 December 2000, he was granted retention of the title The Honourable. In the 2003 New Year Honours, he was appointed a Companion of the New Zealand Order of Merit, in recognition of his service as a High Court judge.

== See also ==
- List of King's and Queen's Counsel in New Zealand
