= Ross Penlington =

New Zealand lawyer and judge

Ross Grange Penlington OBE (Chinese: 彭亮廷; 3 March 1931 – 2001) was a Court of Appeal Judge in Hong Kong. He was also the Commanding Officer of the Royal Hong Kong Auxiliary Air Force from 1975 to 1983. Penlington was later appointed to be the Honorary Air Commodore of the Force.

Penlington was born on 3 March 1931 in Christchurch, New Zealand. His father was Cedric Grange Penlington and his mother was Elsie May (née Flanagan). He received his education at Elmwood Primary School, Christ's College, and the University of Canterbury; he graduated with an LLB in 1955. Justice Peter Penlington KC, also from Christchurch, was his second cousin.

As the Chairman of the Hong Kong Air Transport Licensing Authority in the later 1970s and early 1980s, he presided over licensing applications which involved BCAL, Cathay, BA, and Laker. He was generally recognised in the industry as delivering judgements that were fair and wise. He was appointed an Officer of the Order of the British Empire (OBE) in the 1980 Birthday Honours. He retired in 1995 and returned to New Zealand, settling in Taupō. He died in 2001, aged 70, survived by his wife and their two daughters.
