= Jean-François Langlois =

New Zealand whaler and coloniser

- Born: 26 June 1808; La Luzerne, Normandy, France
- Died: ?
- Occupations: Whaler, coloniser
- Known for: Early whaling activity and colonisation efforts in New Zealand

Jean-François Langlois (French pronunciation: [ʒɑ̃ fʁɑ̃swa lɑ̃ɡlwa]; 26 June 1808 – ?) was a New Zealand whaler and coloniser. He was born in La Luzerne, in Normandy, France on 26 June 1808.
