= Battle Hill Farm Forest Park =

Regional park in New Zealand

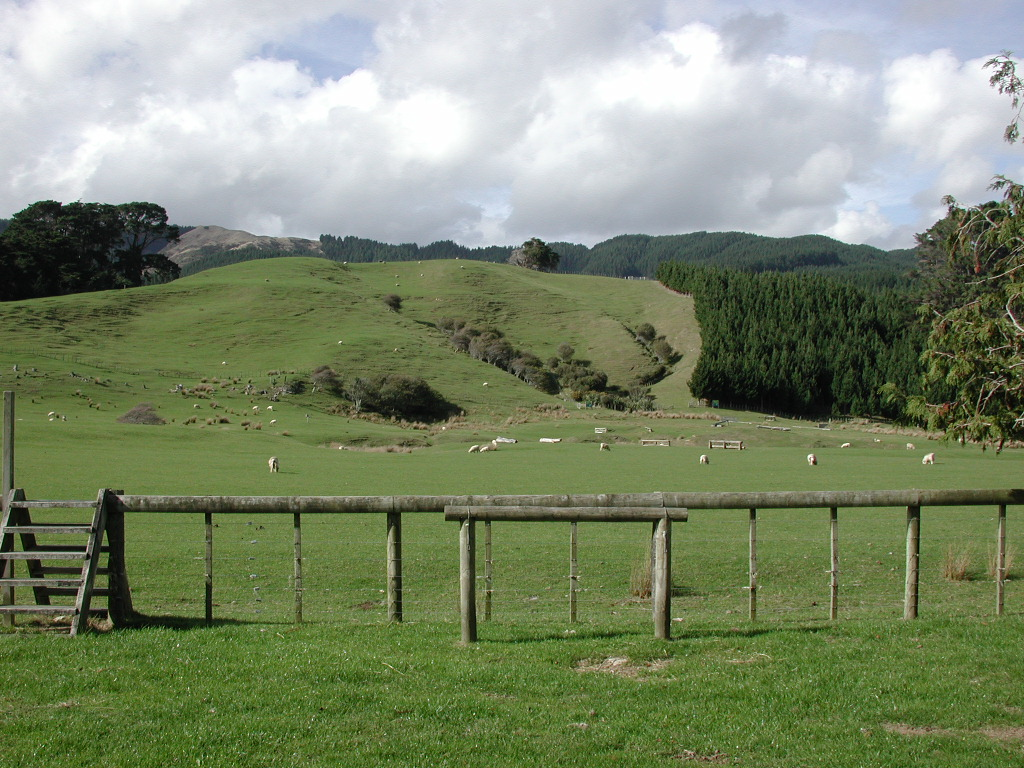
- Battle Hill Farm Forest Park, looking east
- Interactive map of Battle Hill Farm Forest Park
- Type: Regional park
- Location: Paekākāriki Hill, Porirua City, Wellington Region, New Zealand
- Coordinates: 41°3′27″S 174°56′7″E
- Area: 500 ha (1,200 acres)
- Operator: Wellington Regional Council
- Open: Daily from 8am to dusk

Battle Hill Farm Forest Park is a regional park near Paekākāriki Hill, in Porirua City and Wellington Region of New Zealand's lower North Island.

The park is a dedicated farm park, administered by Wellington Regional Council. Transmission Gully runs through the park.

== Geography ==
The reserve covers a stream valley, between Paekākāriki Hill and Horokiri stream to the west, and hills to the east. It includes steep hill slopes of greywacke with limited vegetation.

The vegetation in the valley includes pukatea (Laurelia novaezelandiae), along with some rewarewa (Knightia excelsa), tawa (Beilschmeidia tawa), and kahikatea (Dacrycarpus dacrydioides). The understory includes māhoe (Melicytus ramiflorus), kaikomako (Pennantia corymbosa), nīkau (Rhopalostylis sapida), coprosma, and other small trees and shrubs.

== History ==
Battle Hill Farm Forest Park was the site of Battle of Battle Hill in 1846. Relations between the Government and local Māori had been souring for many years, due to the New Zealand Company trying to buy large tracts of land for Pākehā settlers. It culminated with a clash between about 300 Ngāti Toa, under the leadership of Te Rangihaeata, and British troops.

Te Rangihaeata was captured and relinquished the land in return for his release. He spent the rest of his life in exile at Poroutawhao, north of Levin.

In 1860 the bush was covered to the Abbott family, who cleared it and farmed it until 1975. Members of the family, and two of the three militiamen killed in the battle of 1846, are buried in a graveyard on the site.

Wellington Regional Council purchased the land for a park in 1987.

Access routes into the park were changed, during construction of Transmission Gully between 2016 and 2021.

The council consulted on the future of the park in 2020.

Later that year, the council announced plans to reduce stock grazing and increase native bush and wetlands in its regional parks. However, it excluded Battle Hill Farm Forest Park from the plan, opting to keep it as a dedicated farm park.

== Recreation ==
The park contains a working farm near the entrance at Paekākāriki Hill Road and extends over the surrounding hills and into a plantation forest that merges with the Akatarawa Forest. It contains several loop walkways, some suitable for mountain biking and horse riding.

Parts of the park are closed during August for lambing season.

The park is open to camping and campervans. However, there is no powered camping sites or dump stations.

Wellington Riding for the Disabled, a community group providing horse therapy for people with disabilities, has been operating in the park since 2016.

The park is a ten minute drive from parts of Porirua.
