= Battle Hill =

Battle Hill may mean:

Places

- Battle Hill (Brooklyn), New York City
- Battle Hill Farm Forest Park, New Zealand
- Battle Hill, Georgia, now the Westview neighborhood of Atlanta
- Battle Hill, White Plains, New York
- Battle Hill Township, McPherson County, Kansas
- Gitwangak Battle Hill National Historic Site in Canada
- Battle Hill, an area of North Tyneside in England

Events

- Battle of Battle Hill, New Zealand
