= Rangi Topeora =

Ngati Toa chief and composer

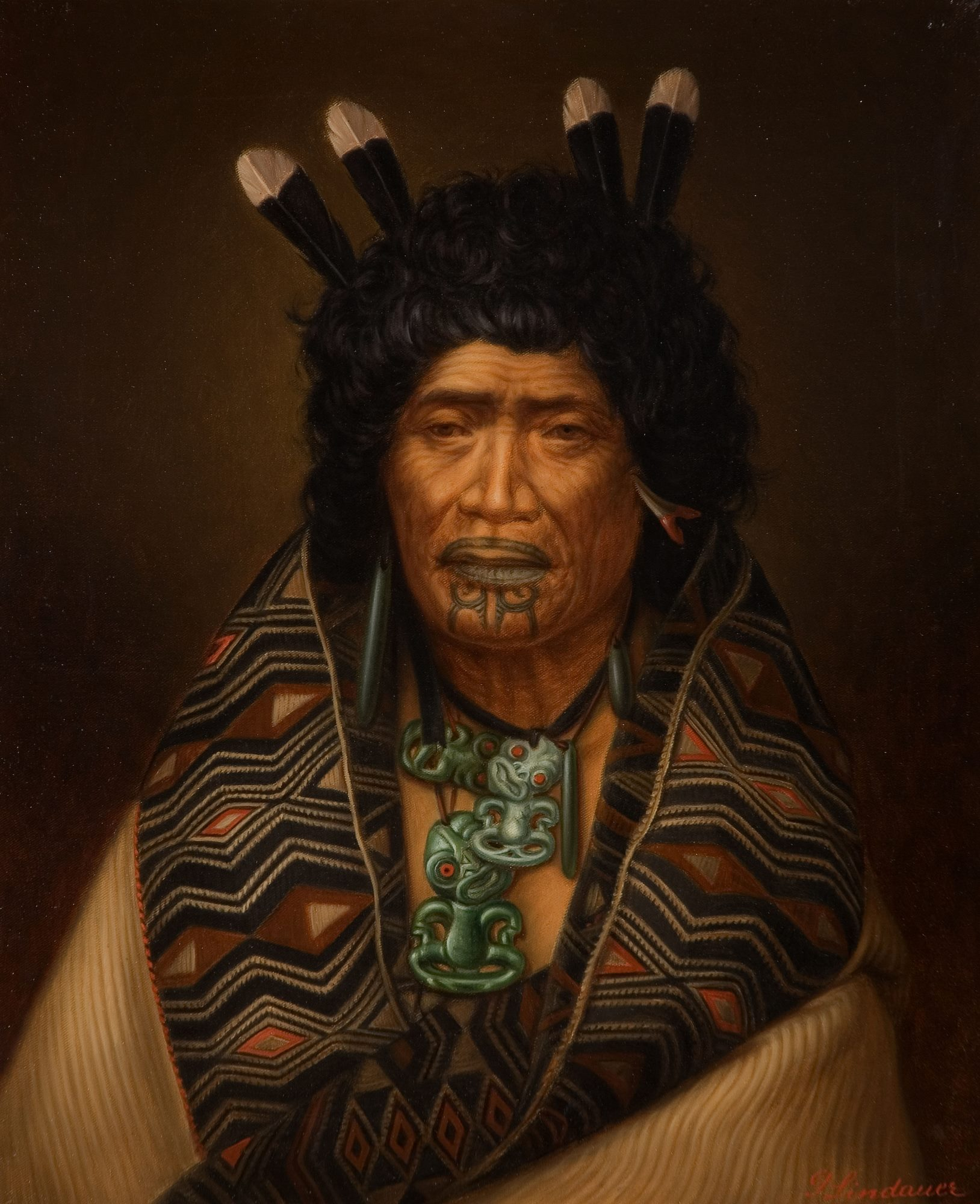
- Rangi Topeora by Gottfried Lindauer circa 1910
- Born: 1790? Kawhia, Waikato
- Died: 1873?
- Relatives: Te Rauparaha, Te Rangihaeata
- Military career
- Allegiance: Ngāti Toa
- Conflicts: Waiorua on Kāpiti Island

Rangi Topeora (?–1865-1873?) or Te Rangitopeora was a leader or chief of the Ngāti Toa Māori iwi (tribe) of New Zealand, a peacemaker and composer of waiata (songs).

== Biography ==
Topeora was born into the Ngāti Toa tribe in Kawhia, New Zealand, probably in the early 19th century, but perhaps in 1790. Her mother was Waitohi, sister of Te Rauparaha, and her maternal grandmother was Parekōwhatu of Ngāti Raukawa. Her father was Te Rākaherea. Topeara's brother was the chief Te Rangihaeata. She was a descendant of Hoturoa of the Tainui canoe. She first married Te Rātūtonu of Ngāti Māhanga in Taranaki in 1818; he died in about 1822. She then married Rangikapiki and they had son Hēnare Mātene Te Whiwhi. She also married Te Wehi-o-te-rangi of Te Arawa and they had daughter Rākapa Kahoki.

In the 1820s Topeora was part of the Ngāti Toa migration led by Te Rauparaha, south from Kawhia, ending on Kapiti Island. In 1836 she helped broker peace between Ngāti Raukawa, Ngāti Toa and Ngāti Tama in a dispute over the sale of Maenene pā on Kapiti Island to a European, allowing her son Te Whiwhi to be involved in peace negotiations.

Topeora was a female chief of Ngāti Toa and spoke for her people. She signed the Treaty of Waitangi at Kapiti on 14 May 1840. She was known to speak formally on the marae, which was mostly done by men. In 1861 she made a denunciation of the Kingitanga due to its distribution of the 'status quo', including writing to politician Donald McLean.

When she was baptised at Ōtaki on 2 May 1847, no name would satisfy her but Te Kuini (the Queen); one of her husbands was given the name Arapeta (Albert), after Queen Victoria's consort. Later she was commonly known as the 'Queen of the South'.

Topeora composed the song "He Kai-oraora na Tope-ora", which was a 'kaioraora', a cursing song to vent hatred at enemies. This song was because of deaths of some Ngāti Toa women by the iwi Ngāti Pou. Another song she created was about a triumphant moment in the battle of Waiorua on Kapiti Island in 1824 where she mounted and stood astride the gateway of the pā, forcing the attacking enemy to pass between her legs, thus degrading themselves.
