= Poroutawhao =

- Rural locality
- Interactive map of Poroutawhao
- Coordinates: 40.553°S 175.270°E
- Country: New Zealand
- Region: Manawatū-Whanganui region
- Territorial authority: Horowhenua District
- Wards: Waiopehu General Ward; Horowhenua Māori Ward
- Electorates: Rangitīkei (electorate); Te Tai Hauāuru (Māori)

Government
  - Territorial Authority: Horowhenua District Council
  - Regional council: Horizons Regional Council
  - Horowhenua Mayor: Bernie Wanden
  - Rangitīkei MP: Suze Redmayne
  - Te Tai Hauāuru MP: Debbie Ngarewa-Packer
- Postal code: 5572

Poroutawhao is a small rural settlement in the Horowhenua District of New Zealand's North Island. It is located just north-west of Levin on State Highway 1.

The settlement has a school and a community hall, which due to its old age has been expensive to maintain.

Huia Marae and Matau Marae, located next to each other south of the main settlement, are traditional meeting grounds of the Ngāti Raukawa hapū of Ngāti Huia.

There are several Māori land blocks around the marae, and both north and south of the settlement.

== Demographics ==
Demographics for Poroutawhao are included at Koputaroa#Demographics.

== History ==
Ngāti Toa leader Te Rangihaeata and his followers settled in the coastal river swamp in the 1840s, following the Wairau Affray and the Hutt Valley Campaign.

The party set up a defensible position against colonial forces, but received little support from other Māori. Te Rangihaeata raided Kapiti Island in 1847, as his party tried to fend off starvation. He also starting charging a toll to people travelling through Poroutawhao on the Foxton to Levin Road, until reaching an agreement with Governor Grey in 1853.

Te Rangihaeata died at Poroutawhao in 1855 and was buried there with his wife, Ngāti Apa woman of mana Te Pikinga.

In 1920, Native Land Court agent and interpreter Ben Keys travelled through Poroutawhao, recording the experiences of local Māori in his diary.

A 1963 photograph of the Huia marae, held at Kapiti Coast Library, shows a small carved house with Kowhaiwhai decorations on the porch.

== Education ==
Poroutawhao School is a co-educational state primary school for Year 1 to 8 students, with a roll of 95 as of July 2026. It opened in 1924.
