= Tāmihana Te Rauparaha =

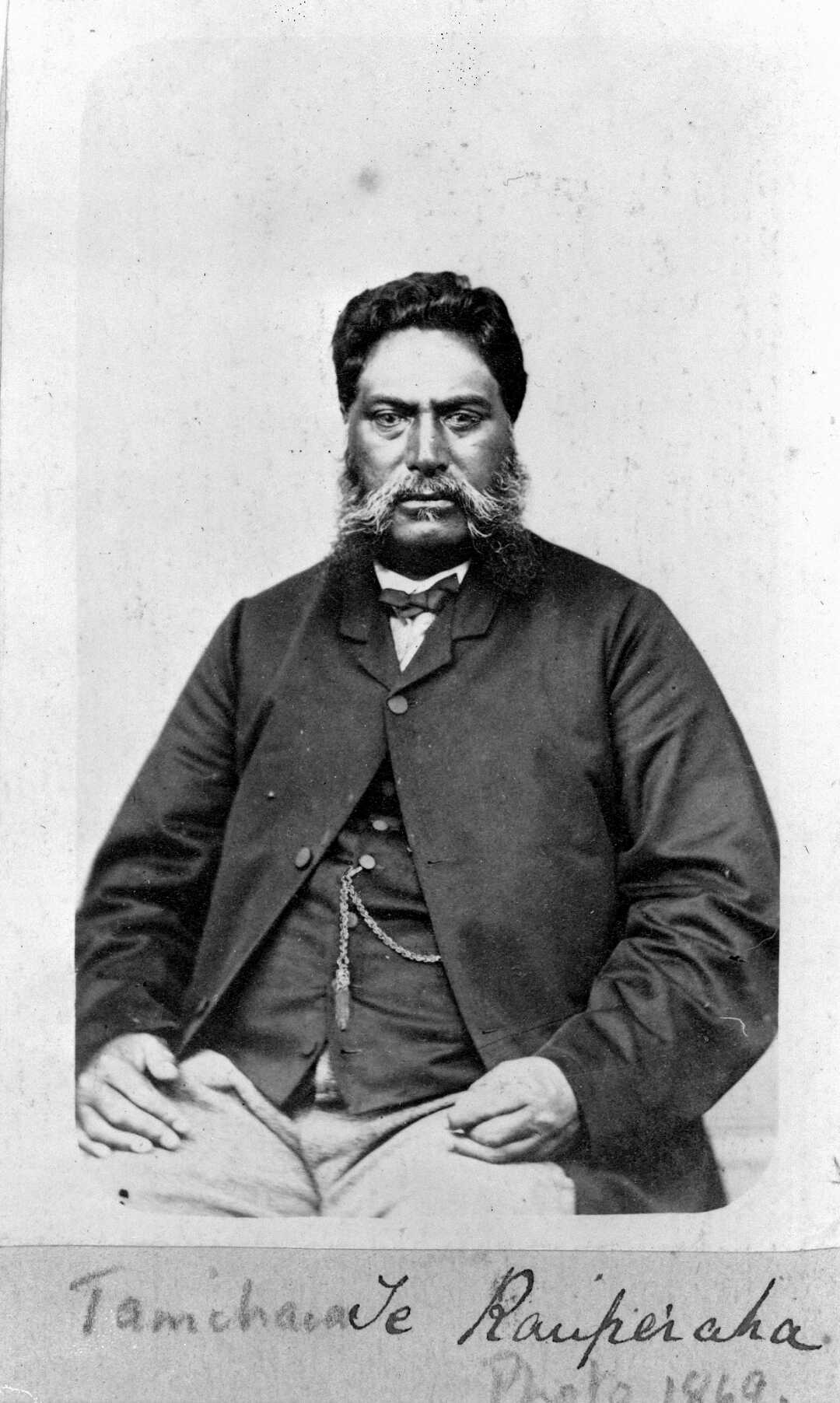
- Tāmihana Te Rauparaha, 1869
- Born: Katu; 1820s Pukearuhe, Taranaki, New Zealand
- Died: 24 October 1876
- Known for: New Zealand Māori leader, Christian evangelist, assessor, writer and farmer.
- Parent(s): Te Rauparaha and Te Ākau

Tāmihana (born Katu) Te Rauparaha (1820s – October 1876) was a New Zealand Māori leader, Christian evangelist, assessor, writer and farmer.

Katu was born in Pukearuhe, Taranaki, New Zealand, in the early 1820s, the son of the great Ngāti Toa leader Te Rauparaha and his fifth and senior wife, Te Ākau of Tūhourangi. His family and tribe soon moved to Kapiti Island. He went with his father on war expeditions while still a child.

Christianity was introduced to the Kapiti region by Māori who had been captives in the Bay of Islands and were released when their captors converted to Christianity. Kahu and his cousin Te Whiwhi went to the Bay of Islands to ask for a missionary to be stationed in the Kapiti region, with the result that Octavius Hadfield moved and settled there. Katu was strongly influenced by Church Missionary Society teaching. He was baptised by Hadfield on 21 March 1841 and adopted the name Tāmihana.

In December 1842, Tāmihana and Te Whiwhi went to the South Island as missionaries. Tāmihana worked there until June 1843, in the process easing Ngāi Tahu fears of renewed conflict with his father. He cut short the trip and returned home on hearing of the Wairau Affray. He married Ruta Te Kapu in Ōtaki in September 1843.

In October 1850, he sailed for England, where he was presented to Queen Victoria. On his return Tāmihana became supportive of the idea of a Māori King to unify tribes. Initially he joined the King movement in opposing the selling of Māori land to the government, but when Wiremu Kīngi Te Rangitāke, a chief of Te Āti Awa, got into conflict with the government over the sale of land at Waitara, he broke with the movement and sided with the government over issues of land and sovereignty.

He died on 24 October 1876 and is said to be buried in an unmarked grave at Ōtaki, beside his wife. They had had no children, but had an adopted son.

== Writer ==
Between 1866 and 1869 Tāmihana wrote a 50,000 word account in te reo Māori about his father, the great Te Rauparaha called He pukapuka tātaku i ngā mahi a Te Rauparaha nui / A record of the life of the great Te Rauparaha which was translated most recently into English by Ross Calman and published by Auckland University Press in 2020. There was an earlier translation between 1915 and 1918 by George Graham although there were flaws in Grahams translation partly due to the copy he used to translate from and partly he mistranslated some sections.
