= Ngāti Huia =

Māori (hapū) of Aotearoa (New Zealand)

- Iwi (tribe) in Māoridom
- Rohe (region): Waikato & Kāpiti Coast

Ngāti Huia is a hapū (subtribe) of the Ngāti Raukawa iwi (Māori tribe) of New Zealand. The leading chief of Ngāti Huia and Ngāti Raukawa in the 1820s to 1840s was Te Whatanui, who led part of Ngāti Raukawa from their traditional lands in the south Waikato to the Kāpiti Coast.

== Notable people ==
- Āperehama Te Ruru, a signatory of the Treaty of Waitangi.
- Waitohi, a sister of Te Rauparaha.
- Hēnare Mātene Te Whiwhi, advocate for te Kīngitanga.
- Tamihana Te Hoia, a chief of Ngāti Huia in the 1880s.

== See also ==
- List of Māori iwi
