= Te Pura Panapa =

New Zealand Anglican cleric

Te Pura Ngapera Panapa (1916–1980) was an Anglican priest

Panapa was educated at St John's College, Auckland and ordained in 1961. After a curacy at Holy Trinity, Stratford-on-Avon he was a missionary in Waitomo then Rangiātea. He was Archdeacon of Kāpiti from 1970 until his death.
