= Christine Harvey =

New Zealand tā moko artist

- Born: Christchurch, New Zealand
- Known for: Tā moko
- Children: 5

Christine Harvey is a New Zealand tā moko (Māori tattoo) artist and teacher.

== Life and career ==
Harvey was born in Christchurch. She has both Moriori and Māori heritage, and belongs to the Māori iwi (tribes) of Ngāti Mutunga o Wharekauri, Te Ātiawa ki Te Tauihu, Ngāti Toa Rangatira, and Kāti Māmoe.

Harvey began her career in the mid-1990s; initially she trained as a painter, but became interested in tā moko as a part of her Māori heritage. She was mentored by Māori artist Riki Manuel. The start of her career coincided with a revival of interest in tā moko as an art form and particularly a revival of moko kauae, chin tattoos worn by women. New Zealand news website Stuff has described her as being at the "forefront" of the revival of tā moko.

She has designed and inked traditional tā moko all over New Zealand, and many customers request her work because she is one of few women who practice the art. She uses modern tools as well as traditional uhi (chisels) carved from bone. She was the artist for Ariana Tikao's moko kauae, and Tikao wrote a book about the experience (together with photographs by Matt Calman and Māori language text by Ross Calman) called Mokorua (published by Auckland University Press in 2022).

Harvey also has some experience in whakairo (traditional Māori carving); in 2021 she was one of eight female Māori artists whose traditional carvings were featured in an online and in-person exhibition held by Toi Māori Aotearoa.

As of 2017 Harvey was also working as an art teacher at Te Kura Whakapūmau Te Reo Tūturu ki Waitaha school in Christchurch. She homeschooled her five children, and one of her daughters is also a tā moko artist.
