= Jolene Douglas =

New Zealand artist

Jolene Douglas is a contemporary New Zealand Māori artist (Ngāti Pu, Ngāti Maru, Ngāti Raukawa) who has been exhibiting since 1983. Two of her art works are in the collection of Museum of New Zealand Te Papa Tongarewa. She is currently living in Gisborne and been a curator Tairawhiti Museum since 1995. Douglas was born in 1950 in Matamata, New Zealand.

Douglas's art work is primarily in pastels and is described as self-reflective. The republished cover of the classic New Zealand novel by Witi Ihimaera, The Matriarch, features one of Douglas's artworks. Her work is in the collections of the Auckland Art Gallery Toi o Tāmaki and the Museum of New Zealand Te Papa Tongarewa. Douglas is a founding member of the Māori women's collective Kauwae.

== Exhibitions ==
=== Group exhibitions ===
(Selected list)

Ocean (2020), Artists Nick Tupara and Jolene Douglas, Tairawhiti Museum, Stout St, Gisborne

Sisters / Yakkannana / Kahui Mareikura (2002) Kauae and the Tandanya Collective, Adelaide Festival, Australia

Ngā Wāhine Whitu o Tairawhiti (Seven women of Gisborne) (June 1991), Oedipus Rex Gallery, Auckland

=== Books ===
Jolene Douglas's art work has been published in the following books: (Selected list)

Kauwae 09 : a series of three exhibitions from the Kauwae Group, a national collective of Māori women artists, (2009). Te Matapuna Trust. Kauwae Group, issuing body; Tairawhiti Museum, host institution; Nathan Homestead, host institution; Mangere Arts Centre-Ngā Tohu o Uenuku (Auckland, N.Z.)

Te Kahui O Matariki : Contemporary Maori Art of Matariki (2008). Ed. Libby Hakaraia & Colleen Waata Urlich. Penguin Group (NZ)

Taiāwhio (2002). Ed. Huhana Smith. Te Papa Press (NZ)

== See more ==
https://collections.tepapa.govt.nz/agent/6039
