= Ranginui Parewahawaha Leonard =

New Zealand weaver (1872–1984)

- Born: Ranginui Parewahawaha; 23 September 1872; Foxton, New Zealand
- Died: 29 December 1984 (aged 112); Rotorua, New Zealand
- Resting place: Puhirua Urupā
- Spouse: F.H. Leonard (m. 1894)
- Children: 10
- Relatives: Rangimahora Reihana-Mete (daughter); Karl Leonard (grandson); Te Ururoa Flavell (grandson); Pip Devonshire (great-granddaughter)

Ranginui Parewahawaha Leonard (23 September 1872 – 29 December 1984) was a New Zealand kuia (respected elder). At the time of her death in 1984, age 112, she was the oldest woman in New Zealand, and one of the last people living who remembered the 1886 eruption of Mount Tarawera.

== Biography ==
Leonard was born on 23 September 1872 in Foxton, New Zealand. She was the only child of Ngāti Raukawa parents, and married her husband in 1894 through an arranged marriage. She grew up in Rotorua and witnessed the 1886 eruption of Mount Tarawera. Shortly before her death in 1984 she spoke to the National Film Unit about her memories of the eruption for the documentary Tarawera (1986); newspaper The Press described her as New Zealand's "last living link" with the eruption.

Leonard and her husband were farmers at Ngongotahā and had six daughters and four sons together; two of their children died young and one son was killed in World War II. She was a weaver and continued weaving late in life; her daughter Rangimahora Reihana-Mete, grandson Karl Leonard and great-granddaughter Pip Devonshire are all noted weavers. Another of her grandchildren, Te Ururoa Flavell, is a member of the New Zealand parliament.

On her 112th birthday, Leonard was presented with the Freedom of the City of Rotorua. She attributed her longevity to her sweet tooth. At the time of her death at Rotorua Hospital on 29 December 1984, she was New Zealand's oldest woman and one of the three oldest people in the Commonwealth.
