= Pip Devonshire =

New Zealand weaver (born 1966)

- Born: 1966 (age 59–60)
- Education: Te Wānanga o Raukawa
- Occupations: Weaver; curator; weaving tutor
- Relatives: Rangimahora Reihana-Mete (grandmother); Ranginui Parewahawaha Leonard (great-grandmother)
- Website: Official website

Pip Devonshire (born 1966) is a New Zealand weaver, curator and weaving tutor. Part of the iwi (tribes) of Ngāti Te Au, Ngāti Manomano and Ngāti Raukawa ki te Tonga, Devonshire descends from several notable weavers. She began weaving in the 1980s and graduated from Te Wānanga o Raukawa with a bachelor's degree of design in art in 2000. After graduation she lectured there for two decades. Her works have been exhibited in various New Zealand institutions and galleries, including in the national museum Te Papa. She has also curated various exhibitions and as of 2023 works as a curator at the Mahara Gallery in Waikanae.

== Biography ==
Devonshire was born in 1966. She is part of the iwi of Ngāti Te Au, Ngāti Manomano and Ngāti Raukawa ki te Tonga. Her grandmother Rangimahora Reihana-Mete and great-grandmother Ranginui Parewahawaha Leonard were also weavers. She learned to weave kete whiri (woven baskets) at Paranui Marae, Himatangi, in the 1980s, and credits her grandmother for inspiring her style and techniques, including the use of unusual materials and contemporary designs. In 1994 she created tukutuku for Taumata o Te Rā marae and kōwhaiwhai for her whare tūpuna (ancestral house).

After graduating from Te Wānanga o Raukawa with a bachelor's degree of design and art in 2000, Devonshire taught weaving there for 20 years. From 23 September to 24 December 2005 she and fellow tutor Elaine Bevan were in the United States as part of the Eternal Thread exhibition hosted by the Hallie Ford Museum of Art. As part of this exhibition, they gave weaving demonstrations and were part of panel discussions and lectures.

In 2020 Devonshire and Sonia Snowden were appointed as the first Ngā Aho Whenua Weavers in residence at the Toi Matarau Gallery as part of the Māoriland Film Hub in Ōtaki. During this residency Devonshire curated the exhibitions Te Ringa Māhorahora and Te Rōpū Wāhine Toko I Te Ora of Te Awahou. The latter commemorated the 70 years of work of the Māori Women's Welfare League. In 2020 Devonshire also contributed to an exhibition at the Mahara Gallery in Waikanae in celebration of Matariki titled Toi Whakarākai: Ngā Aho o te Whenua, featuring Te Wānanga o Raukawa staff and students.

She has been involved with the Te Taitoa Māori o Te Awahou Trust and acted as the spokeswoman in relation to the building of a cultural and community hub Te Awahou Nieuwe Stroom.

As of 2023 she sells her own weaving and is a curator at Mahara Gallery. A poi she created is held in the collection at Te Papa.
