= Hēnare Mātene Te Whiwhi =

New Zealand Māori tribal leader

Hēnare Mātene Te Whiwhi (? – 28 September 1881), sometimes called Te Whiwhi-o-te-rangi, was a New Zealand Māori tribal leader, missionary and assessor. His mother was Rangi Topeora, niece of Te Rauparaha, sister of Te Rangihaeata and a very prominent woman of the Ngāti Toa and Ngāti Raukawa iwi. He adopted the name Hēnare Mātene when he was baptised in 1843 and Mātene Te Whiwhi became his most common name. He signed the Treaty of Waitangi in 1840. He died on 28 September 1881.
