= Karl Leonard =

New Zealand carver and weaver

Karl Rangikawhiti Leonard (born 1964) is a New Zealand carver and weaver of Te Arawa, Ngāti Awa and Ngāti Raukawa descent. He was the first man elected to the committee of the national Māori weavers' collective, Te Roopu Raranga Whatu o Aotearoa.

He learned weaving from his mother and grandmother. His grandmother was the noted weaver Ranginui Parewahawaha, who critiqued his first kete (basket) at the age of 112. He attributes his time as a weaver and guide at the Māori Arts and Crafts Institute in Rotorua as fundamental to his practice. He acknowledges Bubbles Mihinui, Mini Hohepa, Kura Raponui, Homai Balzer, Denny Anaru, Katiroa Tuhakaraina and Emily Schuster as major influences and teachers of fibre arts during his time there. Leonard, a teacher himself, lectured at Te Wānanga o Raukawa between 2001 and 2010.

In 2012, Leonard was selected for a six-week bicultural exchange through Creative New Zealand, the Toi Sgwigwialtxw Residency.

Leonard pays close attention to detail and process: "everything is done by hand, from extraction to spinning to dying to weaving designs". Nigel Borell writes that Leonard's works "are complemented with natural dyes and dying techniques, giving the garments a dignity that is not complicated or contrived".

Leonard's works are held at the Museum of New Zealand Te Papa Tongarewa and the Musical Instrument Museum in Phoenix, Arizona.

== Selected exhibitions ==
- 2011 Mini Masterworks IV Spirit Wrestler Gallery, Vancouver
- 2010 Indigenous Weavers International Symposium Exhibition, Rave, Rotorua
- 2010 Manawa Wera - Defiant Chants Objectspace Auckland
- 2009 Contemporary Male Weavers Whakatāne
- 2009 Taku Manu Hokahoka The Poi Room, Wellington
- 2007 Māori Art Market Porirua

== Education ==
- 2004 Diploma in Māori Quantitative Methods, Te Wānanga o Raukawa, Ōtaki
- 2003 Master of Te Reo Māori, MReo, Te Wānanga o Raukawa, Ōtaki
- 2000 Master of Māori & Management, MMMgt, Te Wānanga o Raukawa, Ōtaki
