= Paekākāriki Hill =

Rural locality in Porirua, New Zealand

- Rural locality
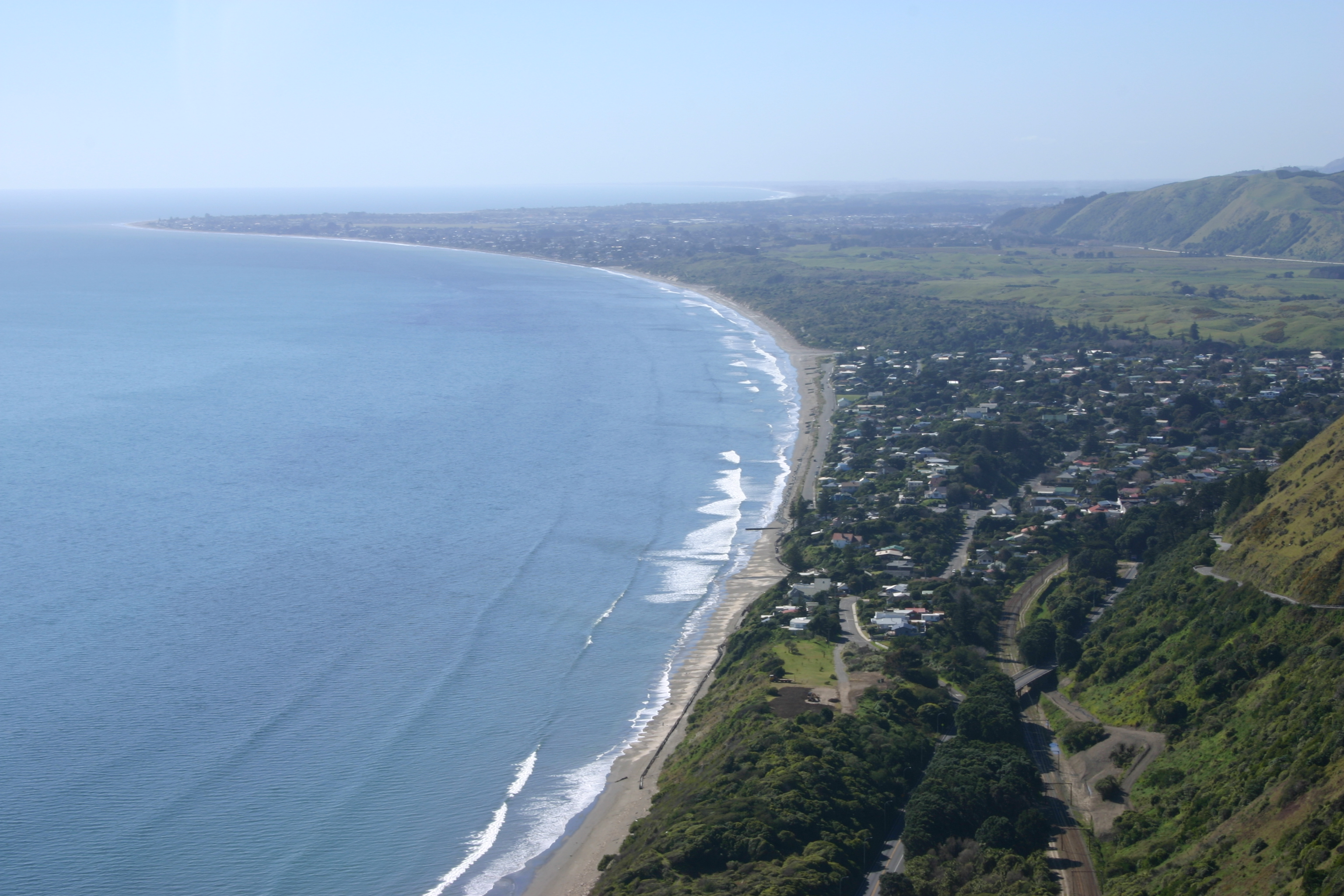
- View from the Paekākāriki Hill Lookout
- Interactive map of Paekākāriki Hill
- Coordinates: 41.060°S 174.936°E
- Country: New Zealand
- Region: Wellington Region
- Territorial authority: Porirua
- Ward: Pāuatahanui General Ward; Porirua Māori Ward
- Electorates: Kapiti; Te Tai Hauāuru (Māori)

Government
  - Territorial Authority: Porirua City Council
  - Regional council: Greater Wellington Regional Council
  - Mayor of Porirua: Anita Baker
  - Kapiti MP: Tim Costley
  - Te Tai Hauāuru MP: Debbie Ngarewa-Packer

Area
  - Total: 35.77 km^{2} (13.81 sq mi)

Population (June 2025)
  - Total: 400
  - Density: 11/km^{2} (29/sq mi)
- Postcode(s): 5381
- Area code: 04

Paekākāriki Hill is a rural locality in Porirua in New Zealand's North Island. It is located inland, behind Paraparaumu and Raumati. Paekākāriki Hill Road runs approximately north to south from Paekākāriki to Pāuatahanui. Grays Road runs along the northern coast of Te Awarua-o-Porirua Harbour's Pauatahunui Arm, which forms the locality's southern boundary.

Paekākāriki Hill Road, built in 1849, was the main highway north until 1939. The road, which is now fully sealed, is narrow and winding. It has views of the coast.

The Battle of Battle Hill, part of the New Zealand Wars, was fought in the area in 1846.

== Demographics ==
Paekākāriki Hill statistical area covers 35.77 km^{2} (13.81 sq mi). It had an estimated population of 400 as of June 2025, with a population density of 11.2 people per km^{2}.

Historical population
Year	Pop.	±% p.a.
2006	351	—
2013	363	+0.48%
2018	375	+0.65%
2023	372	−0.16%

Paekākāriki Hill had a population of 372 in the 2023 New Zealand census, a decrease of 3 people (−0.8%) since the 2018 census, and an increase of 9 people (2.5%) since the 2013 census. There were 186 males, 186 females, and 3 people of other genders in 135 dwellings. 2.4% of people identified as LGBTIQ+. The median age was 48.0 years (compared with 38.1 years nationally). There were 60 people (16.1%) aged under 15 years, 63 (16.9%) aged 15 to 29, 168 (45.2%) aged 30 to 64, and 84 (22.6%) aged 65 or older.

People could identify as more than one ethnicity. The results were 94.4% European (Pākehā); 8.9% Māori; 2.4% Pasifika; 2.4% Asian; 1.6% Middle Eastern, Latin American and African New Zealanders (MELAA); and 3.2% other, which includes people giving their ethnicity as "New Zealander". English was spoken by 98.4%, Māori by 3.2%, Samoan by 2.4%, and other languages by 8.1%. No language could be spoken by 0.8% (e.g. too young to talk). The percentage of people born overseas was 21.8, compared with 28.8% nationally.

Religious affiliations were 25.0% Christian, 0.8% Hindu, and 3.2% other religions. People who answered that they had no religion were 61.3%, and 9.7% of people did not answer the census question.

Of those at least 15 years old, 108 (34.6%) people had a bachelor's or higher degree, 168 (53.8%) had a post-high school certificate or diploma, and 45 (14.4%) people exclusively held high school qualifications. The median income was $52,600, compared with $41,500 nationally. 96 people (30.8%) earned over $100,000 compared to 12.1% nationally. The employment status of those at least 15 was 162 (51.9%) full-time, 57 (18.3%) part-time, and 9 (2.9%) unemployed.
