= Kingi Te Ahoaho Tahiwi =

New Zealand teacher (1883–1948)

Kingi Te Ahoaho Tahiwi OBE (1 December 1883 – 20 December 1948) was a notable New Zealand teacher, interpreter, translator, rugby official and musician.

== Personal life ==
Tahiwi was born in Ōtaki, New Zealand, in 1883. He was of Māori descent and affiliated to the Ngāti Raukawa, Ngāti Whakaue and Te Arawa iwi. His father was Rawiri Rota Tahiwi of Ngāti Ruakawa and he was related to the Ngati Whakaue section of Te Arawa through his maternal line. His mother was Keita Koa, also known as Kapu Meaha and Keita Pera. Pirimi Pererika Tahiwi was one of his younger brothers. He was educated at Ōtaki and Te Aute college, where he later became an assistant master. Tahiwi was married to Jane, also known as Esther Armstrong of Ngai Tahu and Ngati Rakawa.

== Career ==
He was employed by the Department of Maori Affairs from 1915 until his death in 1948. He chaired the executive of the Ngāti Pōneke Māori Association and both the Poneke tribal and executive committees.

== Sporting interests ==
In 1926, Tahiwi became the secretary of the Maori Rugby Advisory Board. From 1927 until his death in 1948 he was the Board's representative on the executive of the New Zealand Rugby Union. He was also involved with administration of cricket, hockey, and athletics, as well as the New Zealand Maori Lawn Tennis Association.

== Honours and awards ==
In the 1946 New Year Honours, Tahiwi was appointed an Officer of the Order of the British Empire for services in connection with the organisation of the Māori war effort.

== Death ==
Tahiwi died on 20 December 1948 in Wellington.
