= Ariana Tikao =

New Zealand singer and composer

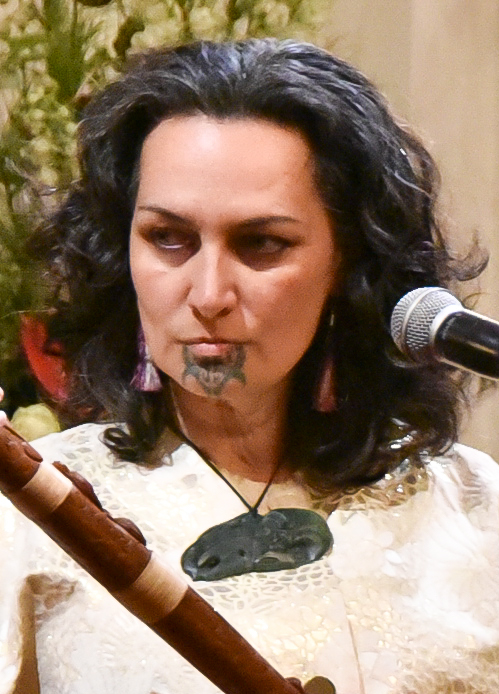
- Tikao in 2020

Background information
- Born: Leanne Rahera Tikao; 1971 (age 54–55); Christchurch, New Zealand
- Occupations: Singer; composer; author; research librarian
- Instrument: Taonga pūoro
- Years active: 1993–present
- Spouse: Ross Calman
- Website: arianatikao.com

Ariana Rahera Tikao (born 1971) is a New Zealand singer, musician and author. Her works explore her identity as a Kāi Tahu woman and her music often utilises taonga pūoro (traditional Māori musical instruments). Notably, she co-composed the first concerto for taonga pūoro in 2015. She has released three solo albums and collaborated with a number of other musicians. She was a recipient of an Arts Foundation Laureate Award in 2020.

== Life and career ==
Tikao grew up in Christchurch, with seven older siblings. She is of Māori descent through her father, and her iwi (tribe) is Kāi Tahu. She attended Lincoln High School, where she performed in school productions. In 1993 she graduated from the University of Otago with a BA in Māori Studies. Born Leanne, Tikao changed her first name by deed poll in the 1990s as part of reclaiming her identity as a Kāi Tahu women.

Much of Tikao's music explores her identity as a Kāi Tahu woman. She was tutored in taonga pūoro by Richard Nunns and Brian Flintoff, musicians who led the revival of these traditional instruments.

Her career began in 1993 as a singer with the folk duo Pounamu. She released her first solo album, Whaea, in 2002, which was a celebration of motherhood and inspired by her own experiences as a mother of two children. The lyrics on the album were all in te reo Māori (the Māori language). It was followed by Tuia (2008). Her third album, From Dust to Light (2012), was inspired by a photograph showing dust rising from the city of Christchurch after the 2011 earthquake. In 2008 she was awarded a $10,000 grant from Creative New Zealand to be the musician-in-residence at Birkbeck, University of London. From 2011 to 2020, Tikao worked as the Research Librarian, Māori, at the Alexander Turnbull Library in Wellington.

In 2020 she was the recipient of the Jillian Friedlander Te Moana-nui-a-Kiwa Award, a Arts Foundation Laureate Award from the Arts Foundation of New Zealand. In 2022, she and Philip Brownlee were finalists for the SOUNZ Contemporary Award |Te Tohu Auaha for their composition Manaaki. In 2022 she completed a Master of Arts in creative writing at the International Institute of Modern Letters, and was awarded a Creative New Zealand Ursula Bethell residency at the University of Canterbury which she took up in 2023.

== Collaborations ==
In 2015, in collaboration with Philip Brownlee, Tikao developed the first concerto for taonga pūoro, called Ko Te Tātai Whetu. Brownlee composed the orchestral framework with Tikao adding improvisational taonga pūoro. She has performed it with the Christchurch Symphony Orchestra, Stroma and the Nelson Symphony Orchestra, and was due to perform it with the New Zealand Symphony Orchestra in April 2020 (postponed due to the COVID-19 pandemic). In 2015 she also performed In Paradisum by composer Kenneth Young with the Auckland Philharmonia Orchestra. In 2016 she performed in No Man's Land by John Psathas together with an orchestra of musicians from around the world.

Tikao is a frequent collaborator with choreographer and dancer Louise Potiki Bryant. Potiki Bryant created the music video for Tikao's song "Tuia", which received an award for Best Music Video at the imagineNATIVE Film and Media Arts Festival in 2009. In 2019 Tikao toured New Zealand performing the dance show Onepū with Potiki Bryant's company Atamira Dance Company; Tikao composed the soundtrack to the show, together with Potiki Bryant's husband Paddy Free, and performed the role of Hinearoaropari (a deity). They also collaborated on Te Taki o te Ua / The Sound of Rain, a video installation art project about climate change which formed part of the 2021 Festival of Colour in Wānaka.

In 2019 Tikao collaborated with Karl Steven on the soundtrack for a documentary called Fools and Dreamers about the Hinewai Reserve. The soundtrack was made available as an online fundraiser for the reserve. In 2021 Tikao and fellow taonga pūoro artist Al Fraser released an album Nau Mai e Kā Hua.

Tikao is a member of the Tararua musical quartet together with Ruby Solly, Al Fraser and Phil Boniface. Their album Bird Like Men was released in 2021. She is also part of the Maianginui taonga pūoro ensemble of women, together with Solly, Te Kahureremoa Taumata and Khali-Meari Materoa. They performed their work Ātahu with the Auckland Philharmonia Orchestra at the 2023 Auckland Arts Festival.

In 2022 Tikao collaborated with Ross Calman, her hoa tāne (husband), a writer, editor and translator; Matt Calman, Ross's cousin, photographer, writer and former journalist; and tā moko artist Christine Harvey, culminating in the publishing of the book Mokorua: Ngā kōrero mō tōku moko kauae: my story of moko kauae. The book is an account of Tikao's journey to obtaining her moko kauae, and features text by Tikao, a translation in te reo Māori (the Māori language) by Ross and photographs by Matt. In 2025, the book was selected as one of the 180 most significant Māori-authored non-fiction works.

== Literature ==
- Tikao, A. (2022). Mokorua: ngā korero mō tōku moko kauae: my story of moko kauae. Auckland, New Zealand: Auckland University Press.
