= Pirimi Pererika Tahiwi =

New Zealand schoolteacher

Pirimi Pererika Tahiwi (16 September 1890 – 30 July 1969) was a notable New Zealand schoolteacher, rugby player, soldier, musician, and community leader. Of Māori descent, he identified with the Ngāti Raukawa, Ngāti Whakaue and Te Arawa iwi (tribe). He was born in Ōtaki, Manawatu/Horowhenua, New Zealand in 1890. Kingi Te Ahoaho Tahiwi was an elder brother.
