= Te Whatanui =

Te Whatanui (died 1846) was the leading chief of the Ngāti Raukawa iwi (Māori tribe) of New Zealand from the 1820s to the 1840s.

His father was Tihao of the Ngāti Huia and Ngāti Parewahawaha hapū (subtribes) of Ngāti Raukawa, which resided in south Waikato. His mother was Pareraukawa, sister of Hape, a chief of Ngāti Huia and Ngāti Raukawa. Te Whatanui led groups of Ngāti Raukawa settlers to Taupo, then Hawkes Bay, and finally to the Kāpiti Coast.
