= Ross Calman =

New Zealand writer, editor, historian and translator

Ross Calman is a New Zealand writer, editor, historian, and translator of the Māori language. He lives in Wellington.

== Education and career ==
At the University of Canterbury, Calman studied English literature. At Te Wānanga o Raukawa in Ōtaki, he studied te reo Māori (Māori language). His career began in government and publishing, where he specialised in reo and kaupapa Māori (Māori language and topics). At the same time, he edited and revised many classic reference works on Māori subjects by Reed Publishers and wrote introductory books on the Treaty of Waitangi and the New Zealand Wars, and numerous articles on historical topics for the School Journal and for Te Ara: The Encyclopedia of New Zealand.

In 2014, Calman embarked on the project to edit and translate Tāmihana Te Rauparaha's 50,000-word manuscript account of the life of his father, the Ngāti Toa chief Te Rauparaha. Calman is a descendant of Te Rauparaha. The project took six years to complete, with the publication of He Pukapuka Tātaku i ngā Mahi a Te Rauparaha Nui / A Record of the Life of the Great Te Rauparaha in 2020.

In 2019 Calman was awarded Te Toi Reo Māori, the professional translator's qualification administered by Te Taura Whiri i te Reo Māori, the Māori Language Commission.

Calman married Ariana Tikao, a singer, composer, musician, librarian and writer, in 2002 and they have two children.

== Awards ==
In 2023, Calman received an honorary doctorate from the University of Canterbury/Te Whare Wānanga o Waitaha for his work revitalising the Māori language.

His book The Treaty of Waitangi: Te Tiriti o Waitangi won the Margaret Mahy Book of the Year Award and the Elsie Locke Award for Non-Fiction at the 2025 New Zealand Book Awards for Children and Young Adults. Later that year, Calman received the Prime Minister's Award for Literary Achievement.

== Selected works ==
As author

- Ka ipoipo te manu. Ngāi Tahu Development Corporation. (2002)
- The Treaty of Waitangi. Reed. (2003)
- The New Zealand Wars. Reed. (2004)
- The Treaty of Waitangi, Bilingual edition. Lift Education. (2019)

As editor

- The Reed essential Māori dictionary. Reed. (2001)
- The Reed Māori picture dictionary. Reed. (2003)
- The Reed book of Māori mythology. Reed. (2004)
- The Raupo essential Māori dictionary. Penguin. (2008)
- Favourite Māori legends. Reed. (2013)
- He Atua, he tangata: the world of Māori mythology, 3rd edition. Oratia Books. (2021)

As translator

- He pukapuka tātaku i ngā mahi a Te Rauparaha nui / A record of the life of the great Te Rauparaha, by Tamihana Te Rauparaha. Auckland University Press (2020).
- Mokorua : ngā korero mō tōku moko kauae : my story of moko kauae, by Ariana Tikao. Auckland University Press. (2022)

== Personal life ==
Calman was born in Upper Hutt in the early 1970s, and grew up in Auckland, Rotorua and Taranaki. His mother came from a Pākehā farming family in Rotorua while his father's parentage included a Māori mother descended from Ngāti Toa, Ngāti Raukawa ki te Tonga, and Ngāi Tahu. Calman is also a descendant of Te Rauparaha through a peace marriage between Te Rauparaha's granddaughter Ria Te Uira and Peneta Nohoa of the Ngāi Tahu tribe.
