= Rangimahora Reihana-Mete =

New Zealand weaver

Rangimahora Reihana-Mete BEM
- Born: Rangimahora Leonard; 25 January 1899; Maungatautari, New Zealand
- Died: 29 December 1993 (aged 94); Foxton, New Zealand
- Other names: Rangimahora Reihana
- Occupations: Weaver and textile artist
- Relatives: Ranginui Parewahawaha Leonard (mother); Pip Devonshire (granddaughter)
- Awards: British Empire Medal; 1974; Order for Meritorious Service; 1992

Rangimahora Reihana-Mete BEM (née Leonard; 25 January 1899 – 29 December 1993) was a New Zealand Māori tohunga raranga (master weaver) and textile artist. She was affiliated with the Ngāti Raukawa iwi. Her artworks are held in the Museum of New Zealand Te Papa Tongarewa (Te Papa). In 1974 she was awarded the British Empire Medal and in 1992 the Order for Meritorious Service from Te Pihopatanga o Aotearoa.

== Biography ==
Reihana-Mete was born on 25 January 1899 to noted weaver Ranginui Parewahawaha Leonard in Maungatautari. She moved to Foxton in 1920 and continued to live there for the remainder of her life. During her lifetime Reihana-Mete travelled extensively in New Zealand passing on her traditional skills and knowledge in weaving and other Māori crafts. She also served as a judge for events organised by the Māori Women's Welfare League. She died on 29 December 1993, and is buried in Himatangi.

== Art ==
A cloak made by Reihana-Mete was presented to the British High Commissioner George Fergusson by the Ngāti Raukawa iwi. Te Papa also holds a collection of Reihana-Mete's work. In 1993 works by Reihana-Mete formed part of the exhibition Ngā puna roimata o Te Arawa held at Te Papa that also featured works by Te Hikapuhi Wiremu Poihipi and Mākereti Papakura. In 2006 a retrospective of her life and work was held in Foxton. This exhibition inspired the formation of the Te Taitoa Māori o Te Awahou Trust which has the mission of sharing Ngāti Raukawa ki te Tonga culture.

== Family ==
Reihana-Mete was married twice. Her first husband was Pitihera Reihana who died in 1954. Her second husband was Whitu Mete. Her granddaughter Pip Devonshire is also a noted weaver.

== Honours and awards ==
In the 1974 New Year Honours, Reihana-Mete was awarded the British Empire Medal, for services to Māori culture. In 1992, Te Pihopatanga o Aotearoa awarded Reihana-Mete the Order for Meritorious Service for her fundraising work including creating items for sale at church shop days. A mural depicting Reihana-Mete weaving was created by Mike Jull and Michael Barclay on the main street of Foxton next to the Westpac Bank.

== Exhibitions ==
- The work of Rangimahora Reihana-Mete, War Memorial Hall, Foxton, 2006.
- Ngā puna roimata o Te Arawa, Museum of New Zealand Te Papa Tongarewa, 1993.
