= Rangiātea Church =

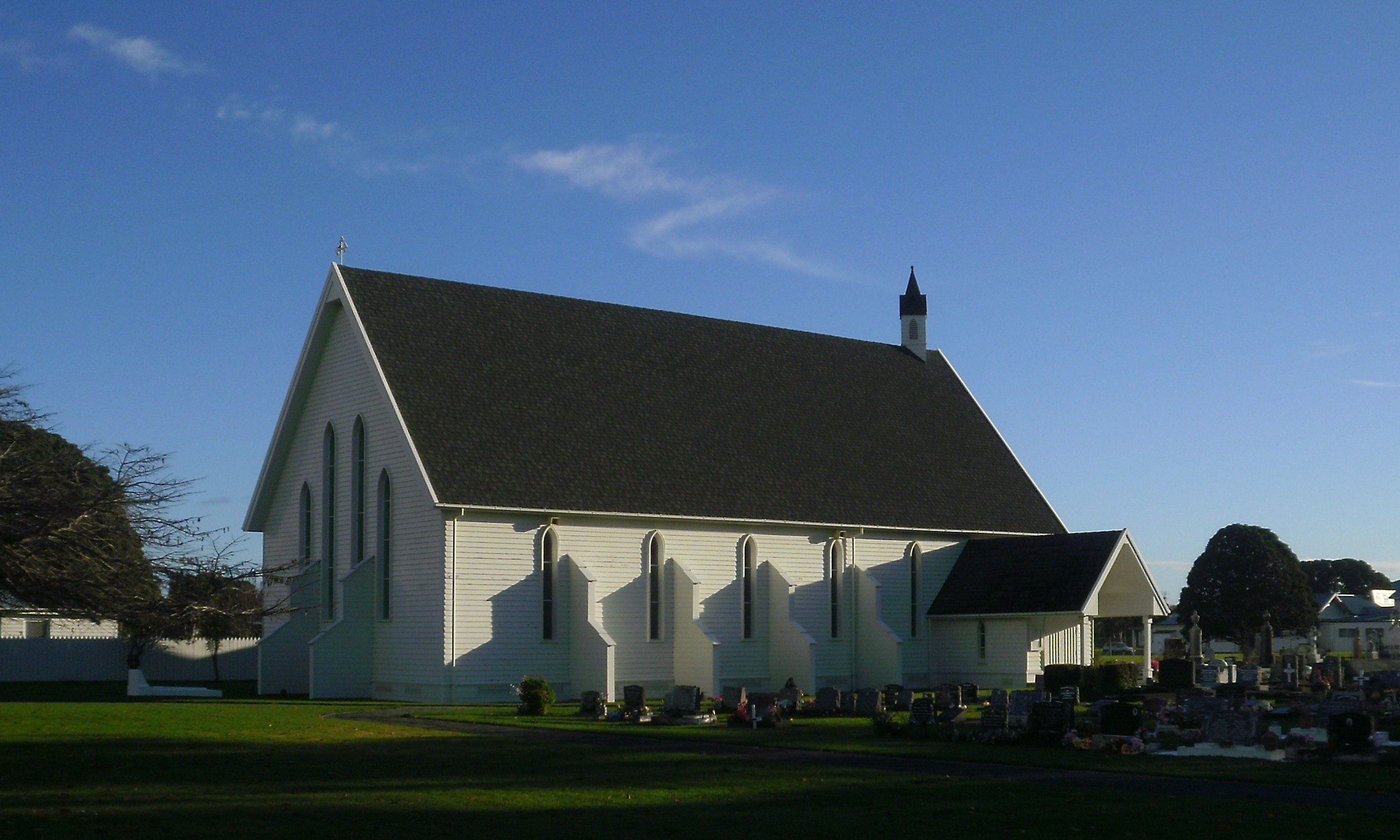
- The new Rangiātea Church building, opened in 2003
- Rangiātea Church
- 40°45′0.1″S 175°8′15.51″E
- Address: Ōtaki, Kāpiti Coast District, North Island
- Country: New Zealand
- Denomination: Anglican

History
- Status: Church
- Dedicated: 1849
- Events: 1995 arson

Architecture
- Architectural type: Church
- Years built: 1844-1851; 2003

Administration
- Province: Anglican Church in Aotearoa, New Zealand and Polynesia
- Diocese: Te Upoko o Te Ika; Wellington

Rangiātea Church is a Māori Anglican church located in Ōtaki, in the Kāpiti Coast District on the North Island of New Zealand. The original church was completed in 1851. On 7 October 1995 the church was destroyed by arson. At the time of its destruction, the church was the oldest Māori Anglican church in New Zealand.

A replica of the destroyed building was completed in 2003; however, historic carvings were lost.

== First church building ==
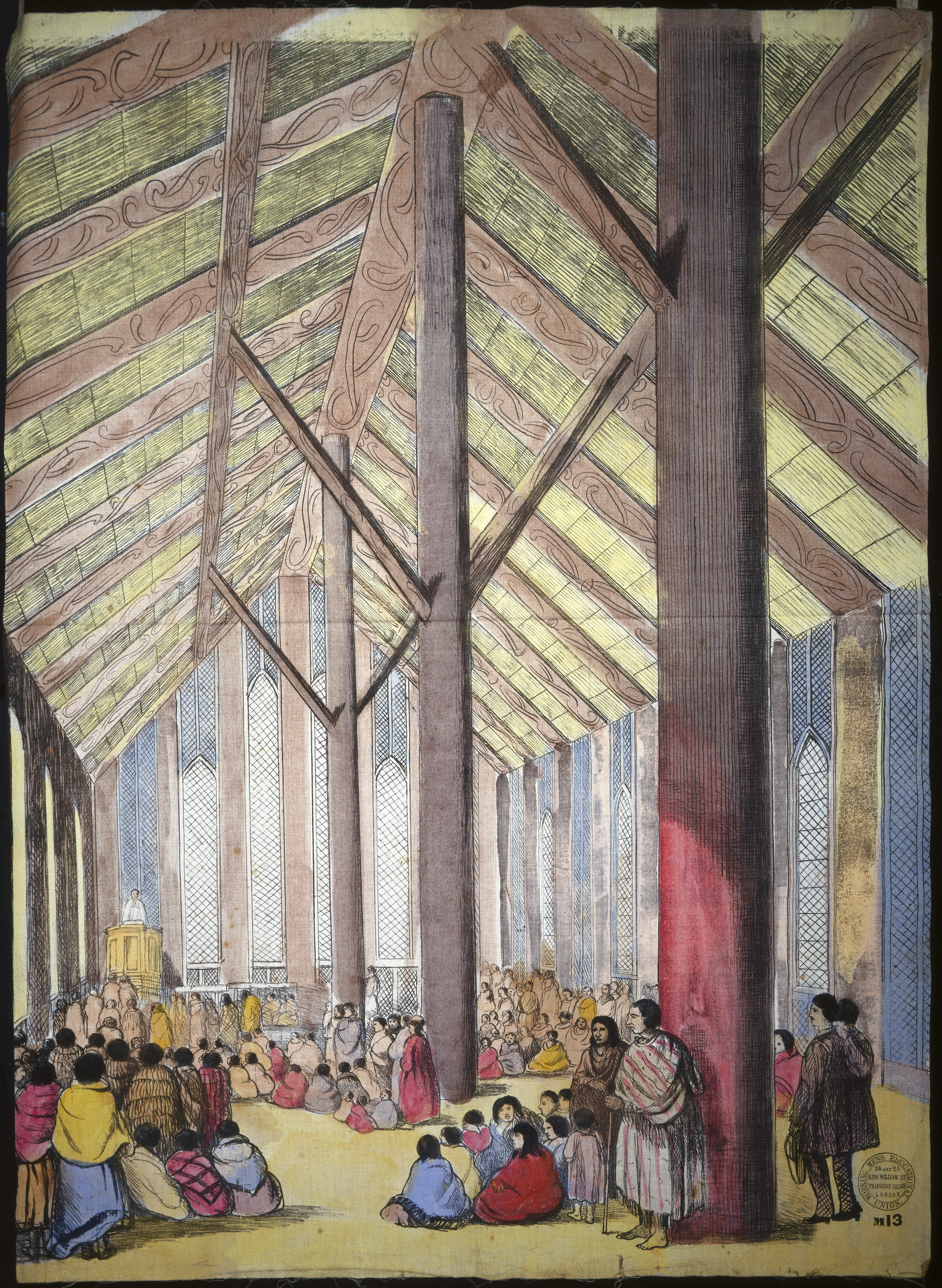
Hand coloured copy of an original lithograph of the interior, printed on calico, c. 1851

In 1848, Te Rauparaha who had just returned to Ōtaki issued the challenge of building the church to the chief of Ngāti Wehi Wehi, who accepted. Te Rauparaha thrust into the ground a sword he had been given by Governor George Grey, saying: "Tokina to mea nei. Kua mutu taku ruri ki te Whenua. Ka ruri au ki te Rangihoatu. Hanga he whare karakia ma tatau.’ [Come and take possession of this weapon. I no more seek honour on earth. I seek honour in heaven. Go to and build us a church.] Rangiātea Church was built under the direction of Te Rauparaha and English missionary Octavius Hadfield. Te Rauparaha died in 1849 and contemporary sources say he was buried near the front of the church, though he may have later been secretly reinterred on Kapiti Island.

Sacred soil was placed in the foundations where the church would stand. This soil had reputedly been brought from to New Zealand on the Tainui canoe from Rangiatea or Ra'iatea in the Leeward Islands and kept safe for centuries.

During the original construction of the church in the late 1840s, large tōtara logs had to be floated down rivers at nearby Ohau and Waikawa. The ridge pole and the three central pillars of the church were each created from single logs. The rafters and wall slabs were also made from tōtara. The church was eighty feet long by thirty-six wide, and forty high, and could accommodate up to 900 people.

The design of the church is unusual in that it incorporates ideas from both English and Māori church design. The walls were formed of large pieces of tōtara about three feet apart, with the spaces in between filled in with tukutuku panels. The rafters are painted with kowhaiwhai patterns. The curved sanctuary railing of black maire wood was carved in a Māori style, with each post having a different design. Stylised figures were not used because some Europeans at the time would have found them offensive in a church, though carvings of six demigods were included on a pulpit installed in 1950. The fenestration and flooring were done by English carpenters. A carpenter named Edward Prince, who had arrived in Wellington in 1841, was employed in making the window frames, as well as some other unspecified work.

Services were first held in 1849, before the church was entirely finished.

=== Restorations ===
Rāngiatea Church's first documented restoration took place in 1886. In 1911 buttresses were added to the exterior of the church and the shingle roof was replaced with one of corrugated iron. In 1948 tukutuku panels were restored in preparation for the church's centenary, which was held in 1950.

== Arson ==
On 7 October 1995 the church was burnt down in an arson.
