= Te Rangihaeata =

Maori chief

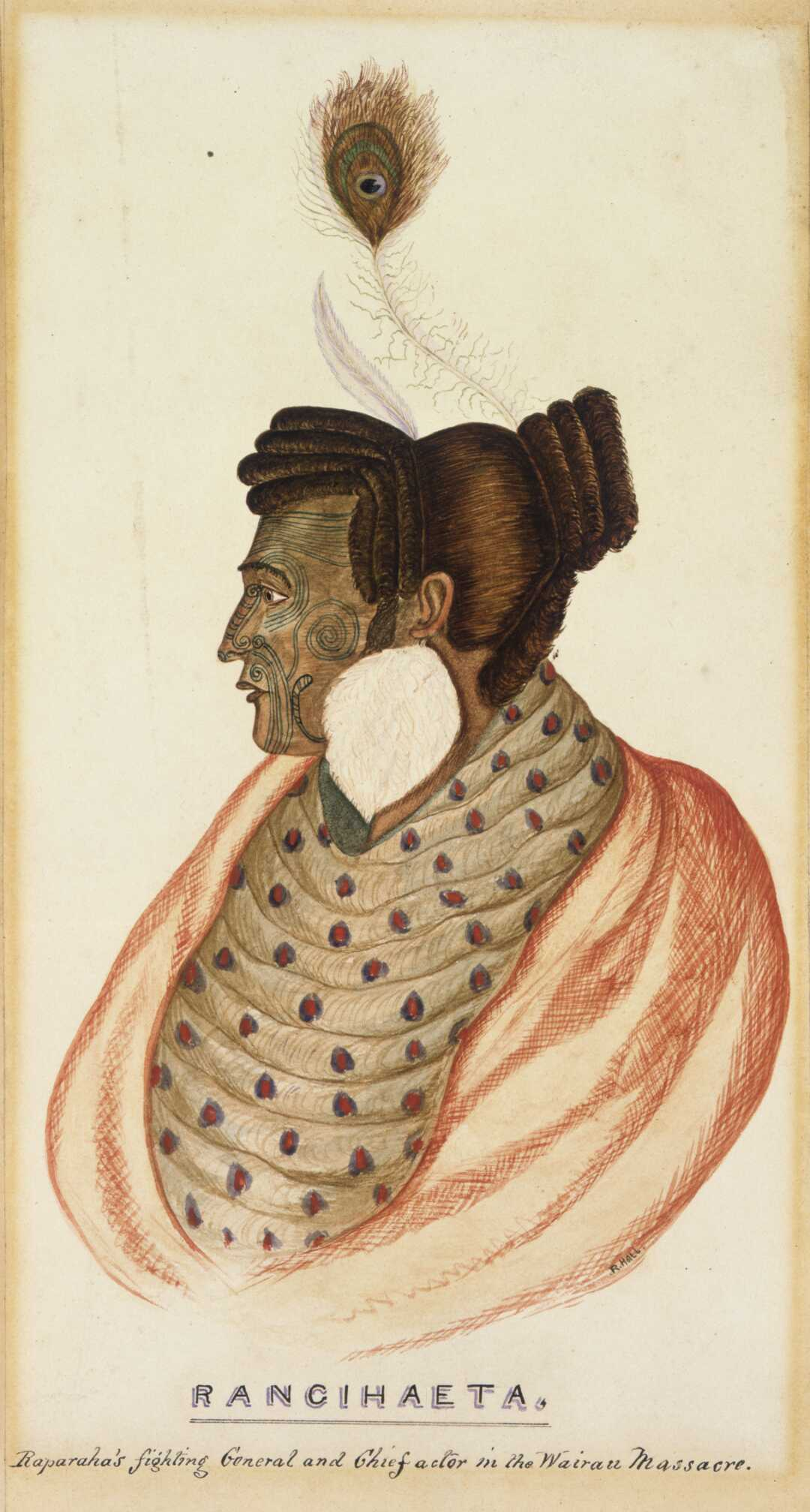
- Te Rangihaeata, watercolour by R. Hall, c. 1840s
- Born: c. 1780s Kawhia
- Died: 18 November 1855
- Relatives: Te Rauparaha; Rangi Topeora
- Military career
- Allegiance: Ngāti Toa
- Conflicts: Wairau Affray; Hutt Valley campaign (one of the earliest of the New Zealand Wars)

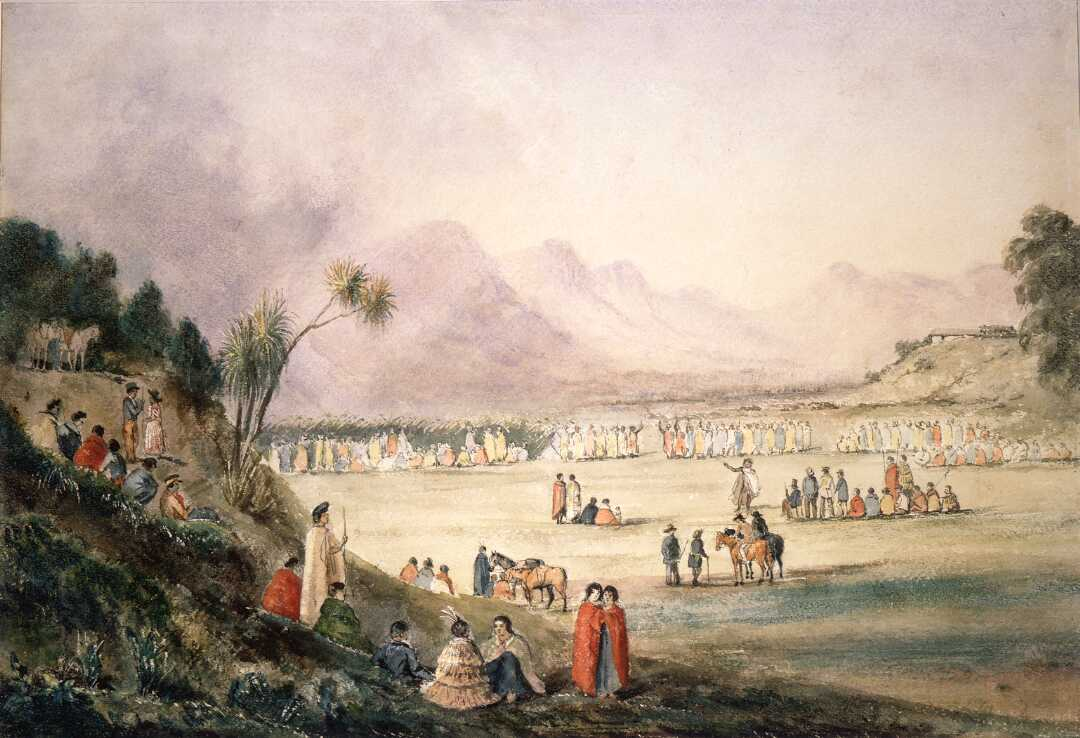
A korero; Te Rangihaeata addressing the Governor-in-Chief (Sir George Grey) at Waikanae, 1851

Te Rangihaeata (c. 1780s – 18 November 1855) was a Ngāti Toa chief and a nephew of Te Rauparaha. He played a leading part in the Wairau Affray and the Hutt Valley Campaign.

== Early life ==
Te Rangihaeata, a member of the Māori iwi Ngāti Toa, was born at Kawhia in about the 1780s. His father was Te Rākaherea, his mother was Waitohi, the elder sister of Te Rauparaha and an important chief or ariki, and his maternal grandmother was Parekōwhatu of Ngāti Raukawa. Te Rangihaeata grew up in Te Rauparaha's shadow and became his trusted ally. Te Rangihaeata's sister was Rangi Topeora who was also a chief of Ngāti Toa and signed the Treaty of Waitangi at Kāpiti on 14 May 1840.

== Musket wars ==
Te Rangihaeata rose to prominence during the period of intertribal fighting known as the Musket Wars. In 1819 while raiding the southern North Island Ngāti Toa attacked Ngāti Apa at Turakina, near Bulls, killing many and taking several high-ranking captives, including Te Pikinga. They took the captives with them as they raided as far south as Wellington Harbour. As they returned north, they sought peace with Ngāti Apa, and Te Rangihaeata married Te Pikinga to conclude a peace alliance thorough a chiefly marriage. This was the beginning of a long-term association between the two tribes.

Arriving back in their own tribal territories the war party found that the Waikato and Ngāti Maniapoto Māori had decided the Ngāti Toa were undesirable neighbours and for a long time a state of war existed between them. Although greatly outnumbered and outgunned, Te Rangihaeata conducted a successful defence until Te Rauparaha was able to use his diplomatic skills to extricate the tribe. This was the beginning of their migration down to the Paraparaumu and Kāpiti Coast area. They subsequently conquered most of that region and the upper parts of the South Island, occupying and claiming ownership of the land by right of conquest.

This forcible change of ownership was to be a source of much confusion and conflict when the European settlers arrived and began buying land. There were often at least two sets of generally accepted owners, and the ones who felt they had been dispossessed were often more than willing to sell land they owned but could not occupy.

Te Rangihaeata was not initially anti-Pākehā. He encouraged the whalers and the traders and was prepared to tolerate the missionaries. He valued them for the technology they introduced and the trade goods they were offering. But he quickly recognised that permanent settlers were a different matter, posing a serious threat to the Māori and their traditional ways. Despite that he tried to avoid open conflict.

== The Wairau ==
When in 1843 Arthur Wakefield and the Nelson settlers were claiming the Wairau Valley, chiefs Te Rauparaha and Te Rangihaeata visited Nelson and made their position very clear. Te Rangihaeata promised that he would kill any settlers who tried to take his land from him. Despite this they were prepared to follow the Pākehā legal procedures and await the decision of the Land Commissioner, William Spain. It was the Nelson settlers who jumped the gun and sent surveyors to the disputed land. Te Rangihaeata had his men firmly but nonviolently remove them, being scrupulously careful to return to them all their surveying equipment and personal possessions, but burning their thatch huts.

The Nelson settlers sent out a party to arrest the two chiefs on a charge of arson. The accidental discharge of a musket precipitated a brief battle, and about a dozen of the settlers were shot. The rest either fled or surrendered to the Māori. Among those captured were Arthur Wakefield and Henry Thompson, the two leaders of the arresting party. Several Māori had been killed, including Te Rongo, one of Te Rangihaeata's wives who was also Te Rauparaha's daughter. The captured settlers were promptly executed in accordance with Māori law and custom. However it was Te Rangihaeata who insisted on it. This incident became known as the Wairau Affray. The subsequent Government enquiry exonerated the Māori and decided that the settlers had acted illegally.

== The Hutt Valley ==
A similar situation arose about three years later in the Hutt Valley near Wellington. The settlers were pushing forward aggressively and occupying land that had disputed ownership. Several years of active immigration and the arrival of British Imperial Troops had put the settlers in a much stronger position and much less inclined to tolerate either Māori claims or legal challenges to their occupation of the land.

Despite increasing tension, the ransacking of settler homes, and the burning of Māori property, Te Rangihaeata remained peaceful. However, Governor Grey soon declared martial law on March 3, marking the beginning of the Hutt Valley Campaign.

Te Rangihaeata fought the British to a stalemate until the British were able to mobilise the Te Āti Awa and other iwi to oppose him. Additionally, the abduction and dubious arrest of Te Rauparaha did a lot to discourage the Ngāti Toa. They built a strong pā near Porirua and successfully withstood a British attack. They then retreated to swamps of Poroutawhao, out of reach of the government, and the war was over.

== Later life ==
Te Rangihaeata remained at Poroutawhao until his death from measles on 18 November 1855. There are conflicting stories about this period, that he fiercely resisted any Pākehā penetration into the area and, alternatively, that he made his peace with Governor Grey. In his old age he took charge of the government-funded construction of roads in his area.

== Legacy ==
The Transmission Gully Motorway, opened in 2022, is officially named Te Ara Nui o Te Rangihaeata / The Great Path of Te Rangihaeata in honour of Te Rangihaeata.
