= Battle of Battle Hill =

Coordinates: 41.051978°S 174.93747°E

Battle of Horokiri (Battle Hill)
- Part of New Zealand Wars
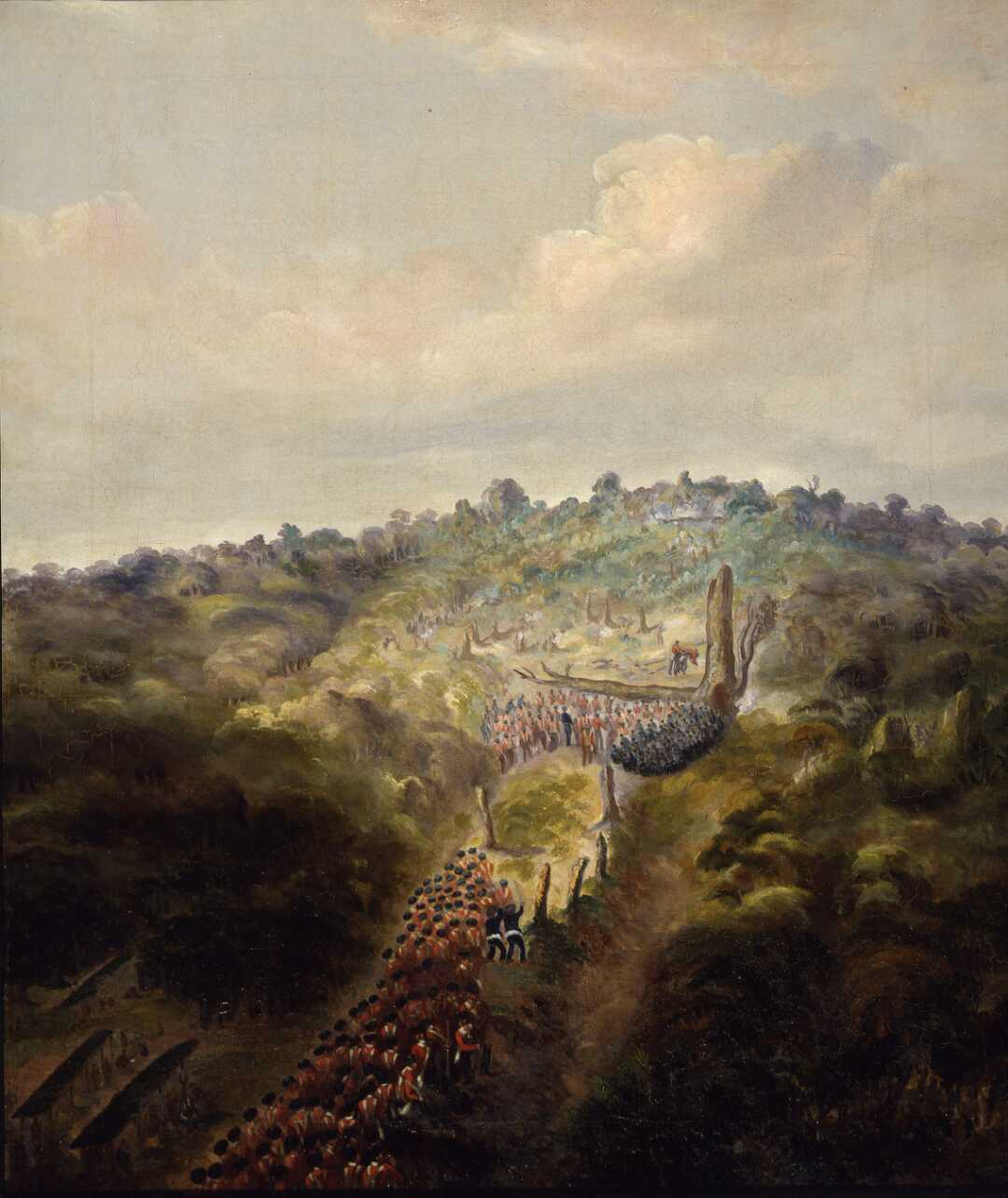
- The fight at Battle Hill, Horokiwi, 6th August, 1846 by George Hyde Page
Date	6–13 August 1846
Location	Horokiri, north of Pāuatahanui, New Zealand
Result	Tactically indecisive, strategic colonial victory

Belligerents
(United Kingdom of Great Britain and Ireland) British Empire: (United Kingdom of Great Britain and Ireland) Colony of New Zealand; Āti Awa; Ngāti Toa kūpapa	Ngāti Toa

Commanders and leaders
(United Kingdom of Great Britain and Ireland) Edward Last; Wiremu Kīngi; Rawiri Puaha	Te Rangihaeata

Units involved
(United Kingdom of Great Britain and Ireland) British Army: 58th Regiment; 68th Regiment; 99th Regiment; Royal Artillery; (United Kingdom of Great Britain and Ireland) Royal Navy: HMS Calliope; Royal Marines; Militia: Hutt Company, Wellington Battalion; Kūpapa Maori Police	

Strength
250 bayonets: Regulars of the 58th, 65th, and 99th, the Hutt Militia, and the Wellington armed police 150 Ngāti Awa; 2 small mortars 12 Royal Artillery men	300 including women and children

Casualties and losses
3 killed	At least 9 killed

The Battle Hill engagement took place from 6 to 13 August 1846, during the New Zealand Wars and was one of the last engagements of the Hutt Valley Campaign.

The engagement was between Ngāti Toa on one side and a colonial force of European troops, police, and Ngāti Awa allies on the other. The colonial force commanded by Major Last was seeking to end resistance to European settlement in the Hutt Valley region. It was pursuing over 300 Ngāti Toa, including women and children, led by Te Rangihaeata.

== Action ==
The battle took place over several days in early August 1846, on a forest ridge around 6 kilometres (3.7 mi) north of Pāuatahanui. On the Government side was Ngāti Toa chief Rawiri Puaha and 100 Ngāti Toa warriors, as well as 150 Ngāti Awa "friendlies". Three government soldiers and at least nine Ngāti Toa were killed.

On 6 August, the colonial force encountered Te Rangihaeata defending a breastwork at the crest of the narrow forest ridge. Elements of the colonial force advanced to within 50 yards (46 m) of the fortification, but pulled back to around 80 yards (73 m) after losing three men, including acting-brigade-major Ensign Blackburn, who was killed by a Ngāti Toa fighter concealed in a tree. Last was unwilling to launch a suicidal frontal assault, terrain and vegetation prevented a flanking manoeuvre. Over the next several hours, the colonials unleashed a musket barrage of thousands of rounds, but with little effect. On 8 August, Last had two small mortars brought up to about three-quarters of a mile from the defenders. They fired around 80 shells, many landing in or near the fortification. Disinclined to attack, and vulnerable to a counter-attack, Last withdrew the regular troops on 10 August, leaving Ngāti Awa troops to launch an occasional skirmish.

On 13 August, Ngāti Awa discovered Te Rangihaeata had slipped away under cover of rain and darkness. They set off northwards in pursuit. The final skirmish occurred on the seaward side of the Pouawha Range, inland of Wainui. Ngāti Awa lost three men, in return killing four Ngāti Toa, before Te Rangihaeata made good his escape.

== Legacy ==
The engagement pushed Te Rangihaeata out of the area and was one of the last fought between Maori and early colonial forces in the region. The site of the battle has been preserved as a recreational area named Battle Hill Farm Forest Park.
