= Te Pikinga =

New Zealand tribal leader

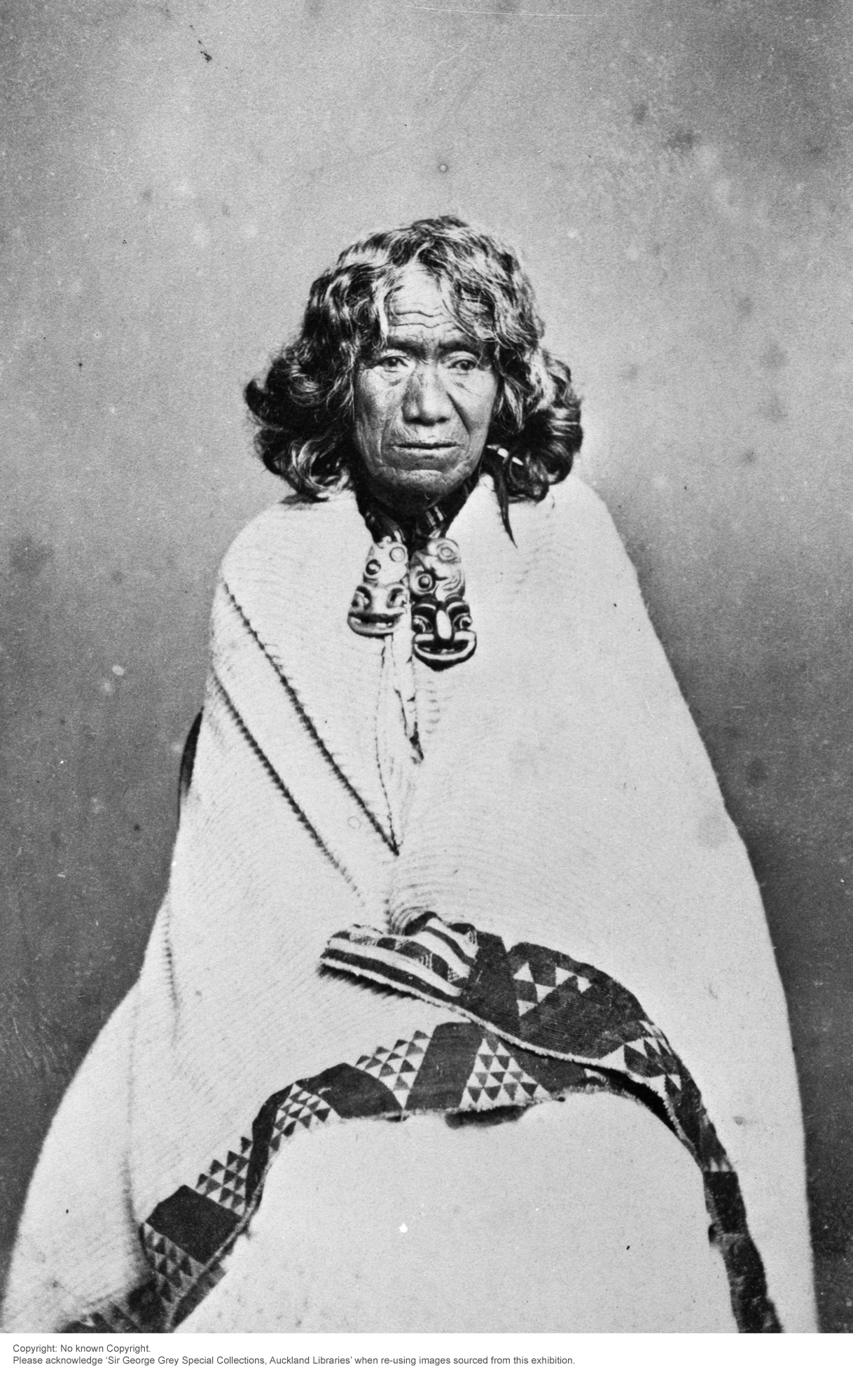

Te Pikinga (fl. 1819–1834) was a New Zealand tribal leader. Of Māori descent, she identified with the Ngāti Apa iwi. She was active from about 1819.
