= Te Rauparaha =

Māori chief and war leader of Ngāti Toa (1760s–1849)

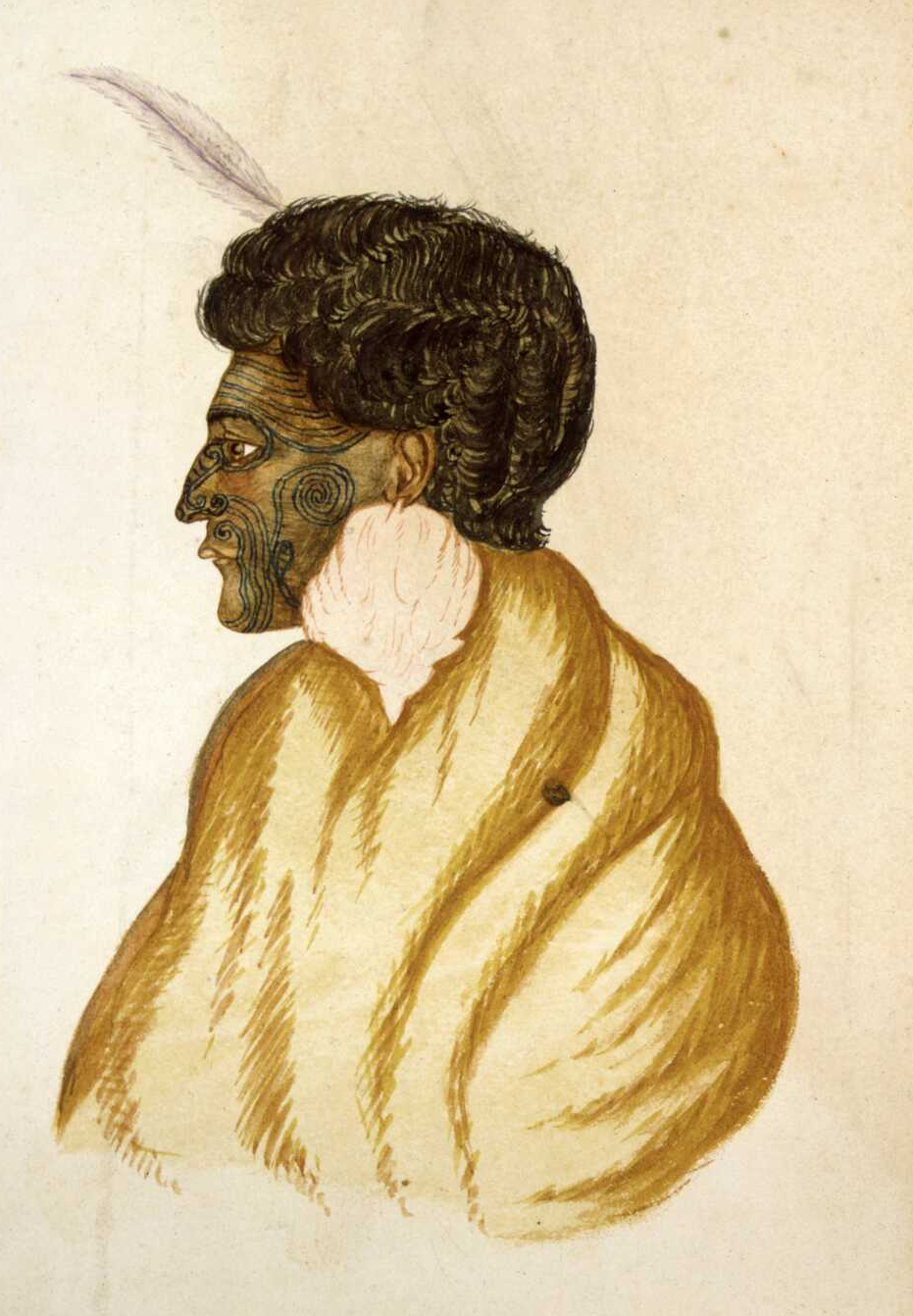
- Sketch of Te Rauparaha
- Born: c. 1760s Kāwhia, New Zealand
- Died: 27 November 1849; Ōtaki, New Zealand
- Burial place: Rangiātea Church, Ōtaki; probably reinterred on Kapiti Island
- Military career
- Allegiance: Ngāti Toa
- Conflicts: Musket Wars; Wairau Affray

Te Rauparaha (c. 1760s – 27 November 1849) was a Māori rangatira, warlord, and chief of the Ngāti Toa and Ngāti Raukawa iwi. One of the most powerful military leaders of the Musket Wars, Te Rauparaha fought a war of conquest that greatly expanded Ngāti Toa southwards, receiving the epithet "the Napoleon of the South". He remains one of the most prominent and celebrated New Zealand historical figures.

Born probably in the 1760s, Te Rauparaha's conquests eventually extended Ngāti Toa authority from Miria-te-kakara at Rangitikei to Wellington, and across Cook Strait to Wairau and Nelson. He participated in land sale and negotiations with the New Zealand Company at the beginning of the colonisation of New Zealand. An early signatory to the Treaty of Waitangi, Te Rauparaha was later central to the Wairau Affray in the Marlborough district, considered by many to be the first of the conflicts in the New Zealand Wars. Shortly before he died he led the building of Rangiātea Church in Ōtaki.

Te Rauparaha transformed Ngāti Toa from a small tribe to one of the richest and most powerful in New Zealand, changing Māori tribal structures permanently. He was an accomplished composer of haka, with "Ka Mate" being well known due to its performance in sport. In 2005, a panel of historians and journalists ranked Te Rauparaha 16th out of the 100 most influential figures in New Zealand history.

== Early days ==
Te Rauparaha's mother was Parekōwhatu (Parekōhatu) of the Ngāti Raukawa iwi and his father was Werawera of Ngāti Toa. It is said that he was a boy when James Cook visited New Zealand, in which case he was probably born in the 1760s. He was born either at Kāwhia or at Maungatautari, his mother's home, in the Waikato valley, where he spent much of his childhood.

== Migration ==
In 1822 Ngāti Toa and related tribes were being forced out of their land around Kāwhia after years of fighting with various Waikato tribes often led by Te Wherowhero. Led by Te Rauparaha they began a fighting retreat or migration southwards (this migration was called Te-Heke-Tahu-Tahu-ahi), conquering hapū and iwi as they went south. This campaign ended with Ngāti Toa controlling the southern part of the North Island and particularly the strategically placed Kapiti Island, which became the tribal stronghold for a period. The conquests eventually extended Ngāti Toa authority from Miria-te-kakara at Rangitikei to Wellington, and across Cook Strait to Wairau and Nelson.

In 1824 an estimated 2,000 to 3,000 warriors, making up a coalition of tribes from the East Coast, Whanganui, the Horowhenua, southern Taranaki and Te Wai Pounamu (the South Island), assembled at Waikanae, with the object of taking Kapiti Island. Crossing in a flotilla of Waka taua (war canoes) under cover of darkness, they were met as they disembarked by a force of Ngāti Toa fighters led or reinforced by Te Rauparaha. The ensuing Battle of Waiorua, at the northern end of the island, ended with the rout and slaughter of the landing attackers who were disadvantaged by difficult terrain and weather plus divided leadership. This decisive victory left Te Rauparaha and the Ngāti Toa able to dominate Kapiti and the adjacent mainland.

== Trade and further conquest ==
Following the Battle of Waiorua, Te Rauparaha began a series of almost annual campaigns into the South Island with the object in part of seizing the sources of the valuable mineral greenstone. Between 1827 and 1831 he was able to extend the control of Ngāti Toa and their allies over the northern part of the South Island. His base for these sea-based raids remained Kāpiti.

During this period Pākehā whaling stations became established in the region with Te Rauparaha's encouragement and the participation of many Māori. Some Māori women married Pākehā whalers and a lucrative two-way trade of supplies for muskets was established, thereby increasing Te Rauparaha's mana and military strength. By the early 1830s Te Rauparaha had defeated a branch of the Rangitane iwi in the Wairau Valley and gained control over that area.

Te Rauparaha then hired the brig Elizabeth, captained by John Stewart, to transport himself and approximately 100 warriors to Akaroa Harbour with the aim of attacking the local tribe, Ngāi Tahu. Hidden below deck Te Rauparaha and his men captured the Ngāi Tahu chieftain Tamaiharanui, his wife and daughter when they boarded the brig at Stewart's invitation. Several hundred of the Ngāi Tahu were killed on the Elizabeth or during a surprise landing the next morning. During the voyage back to Kāpiti the chief strangled his own daughter Nga Roimata, to save her from expected abuse. Te Rauparaha was incensed and following their arrival at Kapiti the parents and other prisoners were killed, Tamaiharanui after prolonged torture.

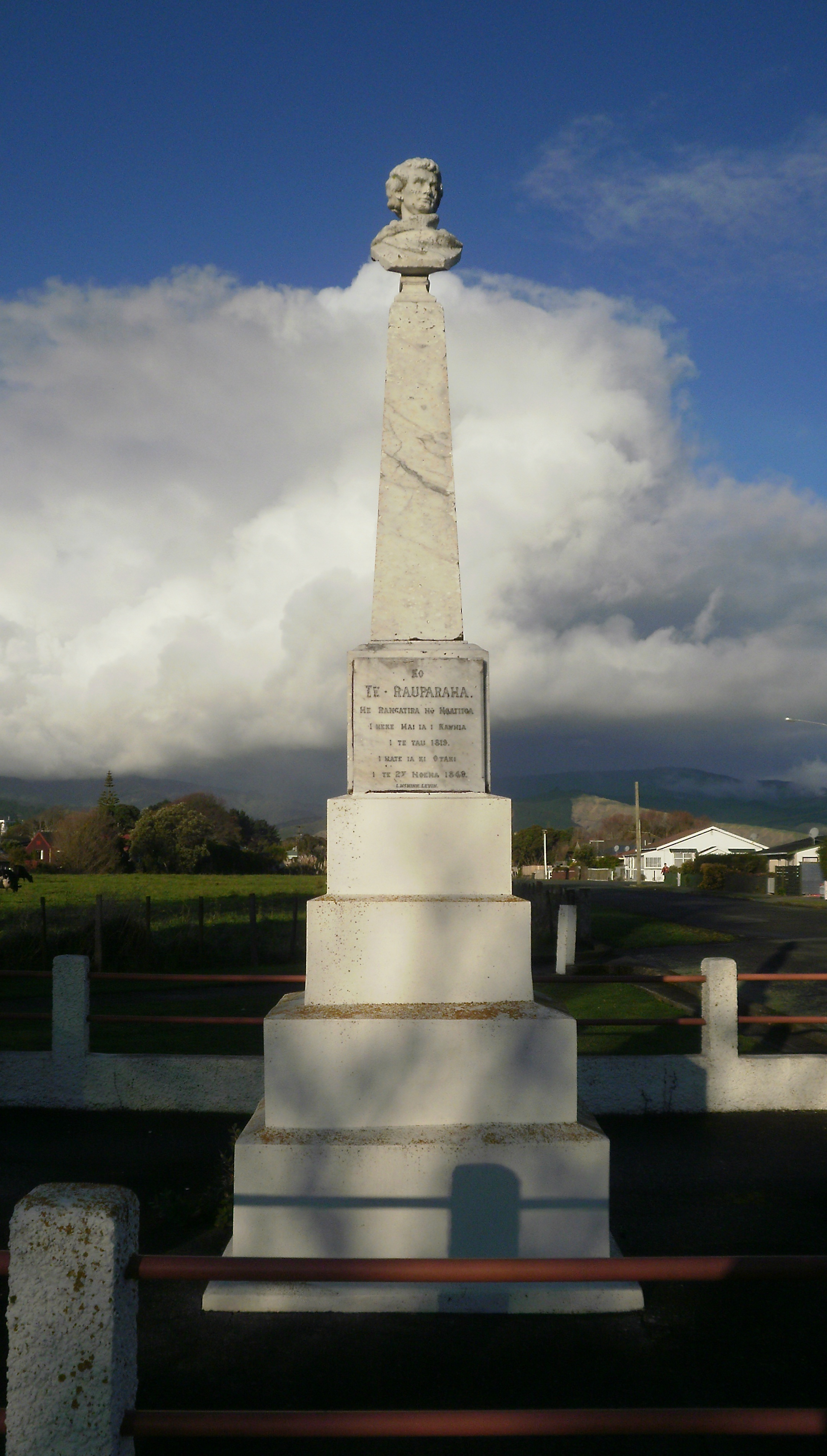
Te Rauparaha Memorial in Ōtaki, commissioned by his son Tāmihana

In 1831 he took the major Ngāi Tahu pā at Kaiapoi after a three-month siege, and shortly after took Onawe Pā in Akaroa Harbour, but these and other battles in the south were in the nature of revenge (utu) raids rather than for control of territory. Further conquests to the south were brought to a halt by a severe outbreak of measles and the growing strength of the southern hapu who worked closely with the growing European whaling community in coastal Otago and at Bluff.

A whaling captain John William Dundas Blenkinsop created a fraudulent deed of purchase for the Wairau Valley that was signed in October 1832 by proxy for Te Rauparaha by his brother Mahurenga. Te Rauparaha understood the document to be for water and timber from the Wairau for Blenkinsop, for a one-off payment of an 18-pound cannon. After this deed was purchased by the New Zealand Company it led to the Wairau Affray in 1843. When a party from Nelson tried to arrest Te Rauparaha and Te Rangihaeata (another Ngāti Toa chief) there was some fighting with loss of life. Twenty-two of the arresting party were killed, in part because of the death of Te Rongo, Te Rangihaeata's wife. The subsequent government enquiry exonerated Te Rauparaha, which angered settlers, who began a campaign to have the governor Robert FitzRoy recalled.

== European settlement ==
The last years of Te Rauparaha's life saw the most dramatic changes. On 16 October 1839 the New Zealand Company expedition commanded by Col William Wakefield arrived at Kapiti. They were seeking to buy vast areas of land with a view to forming a permanent European settlement. Te Rauparaha sold them some land in the area that became known later as Nelson and Golden Bay.

Te Rauparaha had requested that Rev. Henry Williams send a missionary and in November 1839 Octavius Hadfield travelled with Henry Williams, and Hadfield established an Anglican mission on the Kapiti Coast.

On 14 May 1840 Te Rauparaha signed a copy of the Treaty of Waitangi, believing that the treaty would guarantee him and his allies the possession of territories gained by conquest over the previous 18 years. On 19 June of that year, he signed another copy of the treaty, when Major Thomas Bunbury insisted that he do so.

== Capture ==
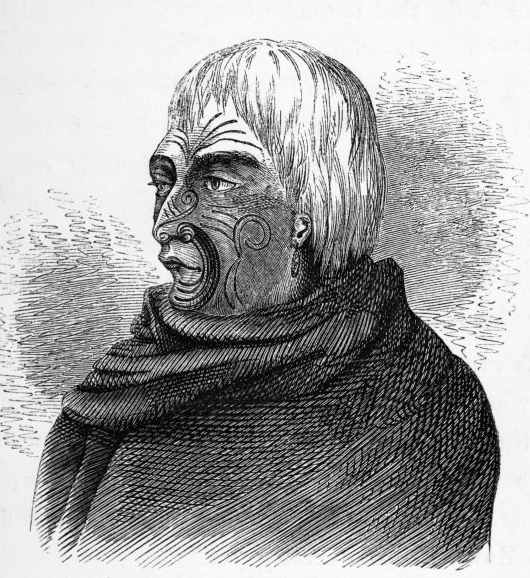
Te Rauparaha, contemporary sketch

In May 1846 fighting broke out in the Hutt Valley between settlers and Te Rauparaha's nephew, Te Rangihaeata. Despite his declared neutrality, Te Rauparaha was arrested after the British captured secret letters from Te Rauparaha which showed he was playing a double game. He was charged with supplying weapons to Māori who were in open insurrection. He was captured near a tribal village Taupo Pā in what would later be called Plimmerton, by troops acting for the Governor, George Grey, and held without trial under martial law before being exiled to Auckland where he was held in the ship Calliope.

His son, Tāmihana, was studying Christianity in Auckland and Te Rauparaha gave him a solemn message that their iwi should not take utu against the government. Tāmihana returned to his rohe to stop a planned uprising. Tāmihana sold the Wairau land to the government for 3,000 pounds. Grey spoke to Te Rauparaha and persuaded him to give up all outstanding claims to land in the Wairau valley. Then, realising that Te Rauparaha was old and sick, Grey allowed him to return to his people at Ōtaki in 1848.

== Rangiātea Church ==
In Ōtaki after his release from captivity, Te Rauparaha provided the materials and labour at his pā for the construction of Rangiātea Church, which was completed in 1851. It later became the oldest Māori church in the country. It was known for its unique mix of Māori and English church design. Te Rauparaha did not live to see the church completed.

== Death and legacy ==
Te Rauparaha died on 27 November 1849.

Te Rauparaha composed "Ka Mate" while hiding on Motuopihi Island in Lake Rotoaira as a celebration of life over death after his lucky escape from pursuing enemies. This haka or challenge, has become the most common performed by the Kiwis, the All Blacks and many other New Zealand sports teams before international matches.

Te Rauparaha's son Tāmihana was strongly influenced by missionary teaching, especially Octavius Hadfield. He left for England in December 1850 and was presented to Queen Victoria in 1852. After his return he was one of the Māori to create the idea of a Māori king. However he broke away from the king movement and later became a harsh critic when the movement became involved with the Taranaki-based anti-government fighter Wiremu Kīngi Te Rangitāke.

Tāmihana wrote biography of Te Rauparaha between 1866 and 1869 that was held in the Sir George Grey Special Collections at Auckland Libraries. This biography was translated by Ross Calman and published by Auckland University Press in 2020 called He pukapuka tātaku i ngā mahi a Te Rauparaha nui / A record of the life of the great Te Rauparaha.

Another biography of Te Rauparaha was one published in the early 20th century. It was written by William Travers and was called the Stirring Times of Te Rauparaha.

A memorial to Te Rauparaha is established in Ōtaki and Te Rauparaha Arena in Porirua is named after him.

In 2005, a panel of historians and journalists ranked Te Rauparaha 16th out of the 100 most influential figures in New Zealand history.

Te Rauparaha is featured in Hamish Clayton's 2011 Novel Wulf, which is a fictional report of some of the first Maori actions with European traders.
