= Ngāti Raukawa =

Māori iwi (tribe) in New Zealand

- Iwi (tribe) in Māoridom
- Rohe (region): Waikato, Manawatū-Whanganui, and Greater Wellington
- Waka (canoe): Tainui
- Population: 31,029

Ngāti Raukawa is a Māori iwi (tribe) with traditional bases in the Waikato, Manawatū-Whanganui, and Greater Wellington regions of New Zealand. In 2023, 31,029 Māori registered their affiliation with Ngāti Raukawa.

== History ==
=== Early history ===
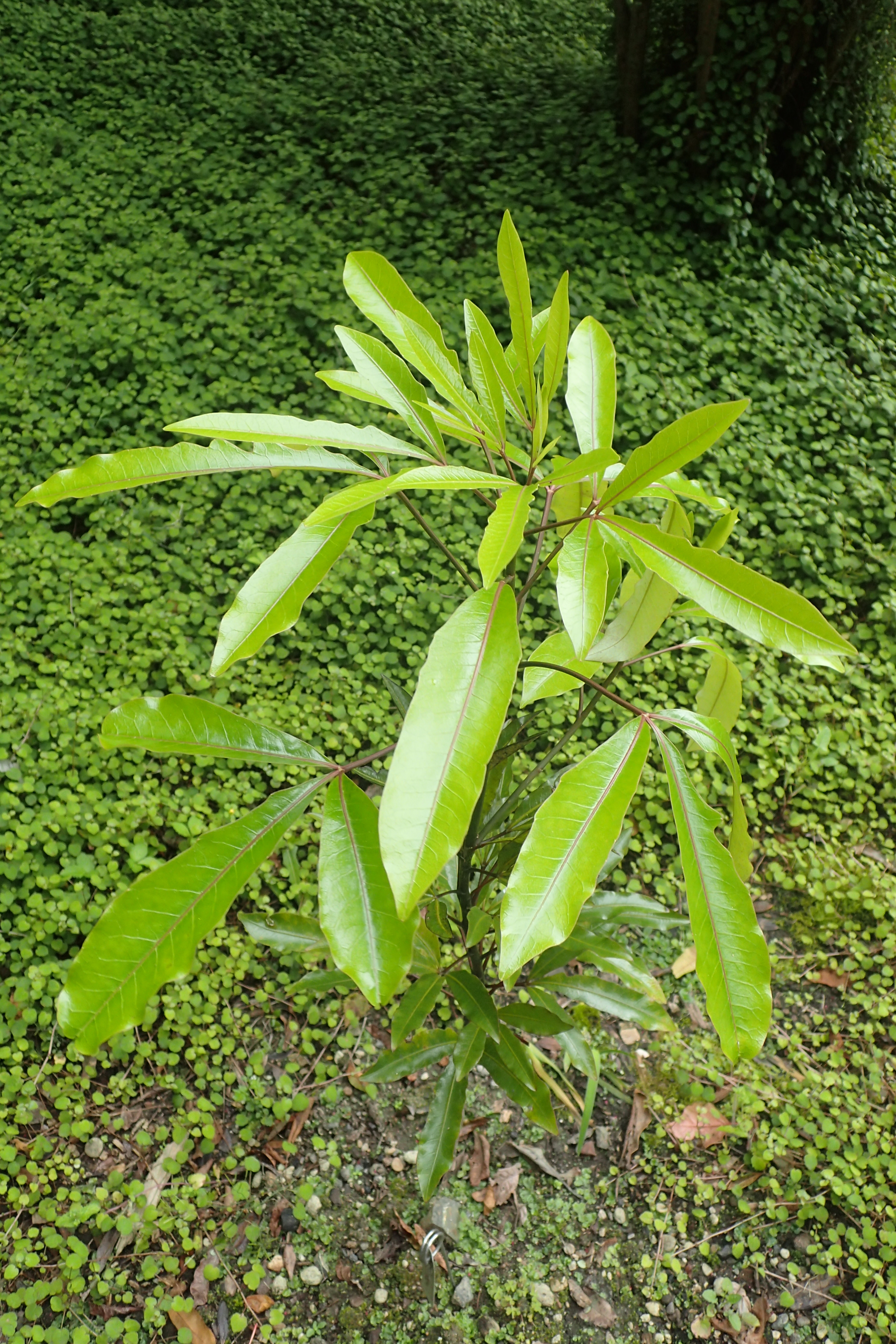
A raukawa plant, after which the ancestor of Ngāti Raukawa was named

Ngāti Raukawa are descended from Raukawa, son of Māhina-a-rangi of Ngāti Kahungunu and Tūrongo, who was descended from the settlers of the Tainui canoe. One of Raukawa's descendants was Maniapoto, ancestor of the Ngāti Maniapoto iwi. Ngāti Raukawa established their territory in the southern Waikato and northern Taupō region. In the early 19th century many Ngāti Raukawa people migrated to the Manawatū (including Rangitīkei and Horowhenua) and Greater Wellington (including the Kapiti Coast) regions.

In the mid-17th century, the Ngāti Raukawa rangatira Whāita, Tama-te-hura, and Wairangi conquered the section of the upper Waikato river between Putāruru and Ātiamuri in the Ngāti Raukawa–Ngāti Kahu-pungapunga War. After this war, Wairangi settled the area south of Whakamaru and his descendants, the Ngāti Wairangi, now share Mōkai marae with a number of other hapu. Whāita took the section furthest up the river, around Pōhatu-roa and his descendants, the Ngāti Whāita, have their marae at Ōngāroto, on the north bank of the Waikato River, a little west of Ātiamuri.

In the early 19th century, significant numbers of Ngāti Raukawa migrated south during the Musket Wars. Led by Te Whatanui and other chiefs, they joined Ngāti Toarangatira in a southwards migration through the North Island, which proceeded in three stages. This brought them into conflict with established tangata whenua in the southern parts of the North Island. They conquered land from Rangitikei to Kapiti, and there settled many subtribes and established many pā. Four of the subtribes, Ngāti Waewae, Ngāti Pikiahu, Ngāti Matakore and Ngāti Rangatahi, are based on the Te Reureu block, between the Waitapu and Rangitawa Streams, at Kakariki, beside the Rangitīkei River.

=== Modern history ===
Ngāti Raukawa has undergone great change in the 20th century. After World War II, many Ngāti Raukawa left their traditional lands and migrated to cities. Starting in 1975, a determined effort was made to revitalise traditional language and establishments.

Ngāti Raukawa have established a large number of marae and other institutions, including Raukawa Marae and Te Wānanga o Raukawa, a centre for higher learning. Administrative organisations include the Raukawa Trust Board and Te Rūnanga o Raukawa.

== Media ==
=== Raukawa FM ===
Raukawa FM is the official station of Ngāti Raukawa. It was set up by Te Reo Irirangi o Ngati Raukawa Trust on 23 October 1990. Many of its first hosts were Tokoroa High School students, and most of its staff are still volunteers. It broadcasts on 95.7 FM in Tokoroa, 93.2 FM in Mangakino, and 90.6 FM across the wider Waikato region.

The station was co-founded by Emare Rose Nikora and Whiti te-Ra Kaihau. Nikora was a leader of the Māori language revival movement, and was the station's first Māori language newsreader, manager and board member. She was recognised for her work with a Queen's Service Medal for services to Māori.

=== Te Upoko O Te Ika ===
Wellington pan-tribal Māori radio station Te Upoko O Te Ika has been affiliated to Ngāti Raukawa since 2014.

It began part-time broadcasting in 1983 and full-time broadcasting in 1987, making it the longest-running Māori radio station in New Zealand.

== Notable people ==
- Hori Ahipene, actor and director
- Tungia Baker, actress
- Georgina Beyer, world's first transgender mayor and parliamentarian
- Nancy Brunning, actress and director
- Pip Devonshire, weaver
- Jolene Douglas, artist
- Eddie Durie, judge
- Mason Durie, psychiatrist
- Mihi Edwards, memoirist, social worker, teacher and kaumātua
- Billy Guyton, rugby union player
- Patricia Grace, author
- Kassie Hartendorp, community worker and activist
- Grant Kereama, radio host
- Karl Leonard, carver and weaver
- Ranginui Parewahawaha Leonard, weaver
- Jaimee Lovett, canoeist
- Haane Manahi, soldier
- Rangimahora Reihana-Mete, weaver
- Ike Robin, sportsman, businessman and orator
- Te Rangiataahua Kiniwe Royal, tribal leader, soldier and sportsman
- Jacinta Ruru, academic
- Harata Solomon, teacher and religious leader
- Bruce Stewart, playwright
- Kingi Te Ahoaho Tahiwi, teacher and interpreter
- Pirimi Pererika Tahiwi, teacher and community leader
- Codie Taylor, rugby union player
- Te Ahukaramū Charles Royal, academic
- Hana Te Hemara, Māori activist
- Te Whatanui, tribal chief
- Hēnare Mātene Te Whiwhi, tribal leader and chief
- Inia Te Wiata, singer, actor and carver
- Rima Te Wiata, singer, comedian and actress
- Vernice Wineera, poet, editor and educator
- Mahinārangi Tocker, singer-songwriter
- Rota Waitoa, Anglican clergyman

== See also ==
- Ngāti Huia, a subtribe
- List of Māori iwi

== Bibliography ==
- Te Ahukaramū Charles Royal. "Ngāti Raukawa". Te Ara – the Encyclopedia of New Zealand.
- Jones, Pei Te Hurinui; Biggs, Bruce (2004). Ngā iwi o Tainui : nga koorero tuku iho a nga tuupuna = The traditional history of the Tainui people. Auckland [N.Z.]: Auckland University Press. ISBN 1869403312.
