= John Henry Menzies =

New Zealand woodcarver, artist (1839–1919)

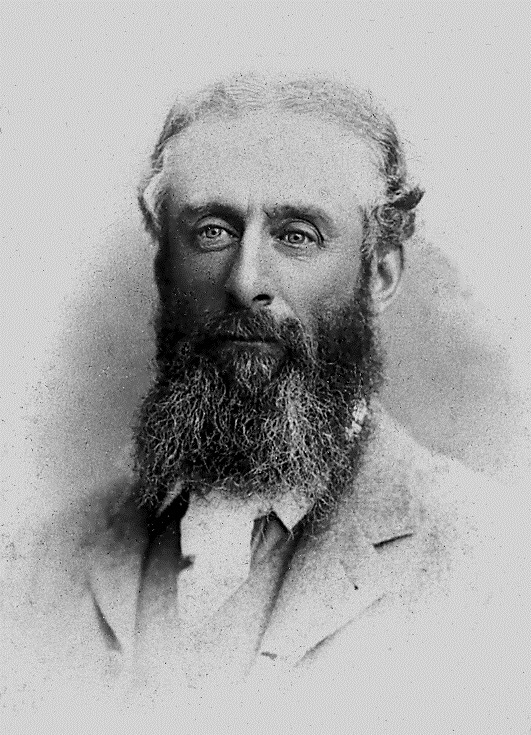
- c1900
- Born: 1839; England
- Died: 1919 (aged 79–80); New Zealand
- Known for: Wood carving

John Henry Menzies (1839–1919) was a New Zealand woodcarver, cabinet maker, farmer and artist.

Menzies was born in the north-west of England in 1839, the son of a cotton merchant. He grew up in the village of Ringway, near Manchester where his father worked. After being employed for a short time at his uncle's maritime insurance business, he decided to become a farmer and emigrated to New Zealand in 1860. Menzies owned three farms in succession in Southland, before moving to a bay (now known as Menzies Bay) on Banks Peninsula next to Little Akaloa with his family in 1877.

From around the 1880s to his retirement to Christchurch in 1910 Menzies was a prolific carver of furniture, and constructed and decorated three houses and a church—St Luke's in Little Akaloa—in a distinctive style that combined botanical forms, Gothic Revival architecture, Celtic patterns, and especially motifs borrowed from traditional Māori carving. Menzies was a self-taught carver with no artistic training; carving was a hobby in contrast to his work as a farmer, but one that became an increasingly large part of his life. He seems to have had little interaction with local Māori, and no contact with traditional Māori carvers (there were no known carvers practising in the South Island at the time).

The first published record of Menzies's carving is in the Akaroa Mail of 1890, when a chiffonier representing a miniature Māori pātaka (storage house) is mentioned. Menzies carved several of these cabinets, Gothic Revival in form but decorated with motifs from a range of different Māori buildings. The house Rehutai in Menzies Bay, built for his son in 1894–1895, was a simple weatherboard dwelling with corrugated iron roof from the outside, but its interior referenced a traditional meeting house (whare whakairo): a ridge beam and rafters decorated with kōwhaiwhai, reeded wall panels, and pilasters with carved tiki where the pou would be in a meeting house. Traditional Māōri proverbs (whakataukī) in Gothic lettering decorated the hall.

By 1905–06, when he designed and built St Luke's Church, Menzies had shifted towards an Arts and Crafts style. This concrete church has a Gothic cruciform layout, but the interior combines Māori motifs from multiple sources, chosen for aesthetic reasons rather than any cultural meaning they might possess, with a variety of other patterns including Celtic designs, quotes from the Bible in Gothic text, and botanical carvings. The stained glass windows reference the tukutuku patterns found on the wall panels in a wharenui.

Since he was using an extensive collection of patterns by the 1890s, Menzies must have accumulated his own library of sketches and notes, as no substantial work on Māori art existed until Hamilton's 1901 Māori Art; this collection was likely lost in a house fire in 1907. In 1910 Menzies published Maori Patterns Painted and Carved, a collection of his pattern studies. In the introduction he sets out his understanding of Māori art, conveying his appreciation of the beauty of traditional Māori carving and a desire to celebrate and preserve it. His appreciation of it was gained from photographs or studying carving directly, but not through interaction with Māori; consequently his work combines patterns and motifs from multiple different tribes without any understanding of their meaning and significance.

About 80 pieces by Menzies survive, mostly in private hands, but also in the collections of the National Library of New Zealand, the Museum of New Zealand Te Papa Tongarewa, Canterbury Museum, the Christchurch Art Gallery, and Akaroa Museum. Both Rehutai and St Luke's were Category 1 buildings on the Heritage New Zealand List.
