= Don Beaven =

New Zealand medical researcher

Sir Don Beaven KNZM CBE
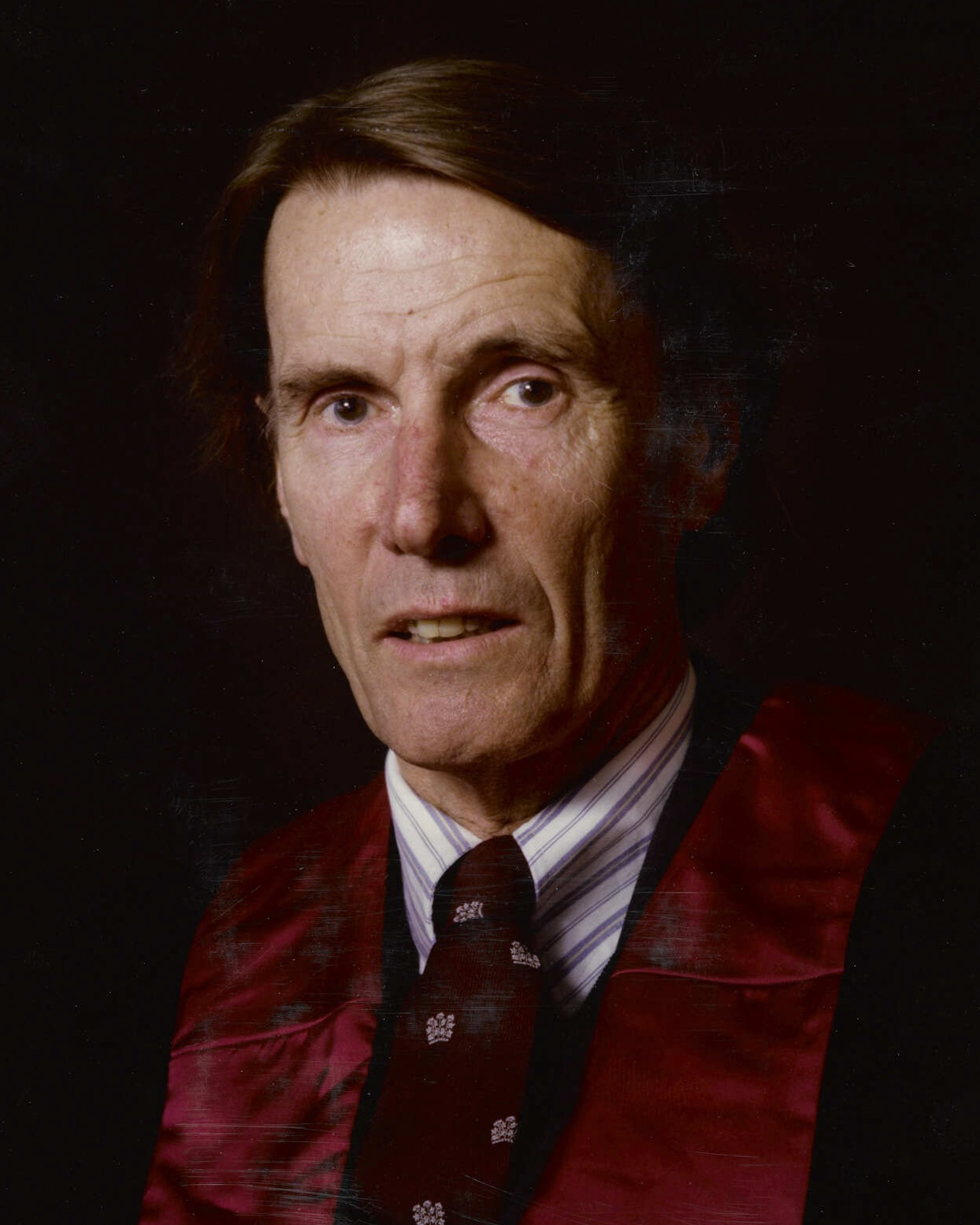
- Beaven in 1981
- Born: Donald Ward Beaven; 31 August 1924; Christchurch, New Zealand
- Died: 4 November 2009 (aged 85); Little Akaloa, Banks Peninsula, New Zealand
- Education: University of Otago; Harvard Medical School
- Medical career
- Institutions: University of Otago Christchurch School of Medicine
- Research: Diabetes

Sir Donald Ward Beaven KNZM CBE (31 August 1924 – 4 November 2009) was a New Zealand medical researcher in the area of diabetes treatment and prevention.

He commenced full-time teaching and research at the Christchurch School of Medicine in 1960, and was appointed Foundation Professor in 1971. The Beaven Lecture Theatre in the School bears his name.

Beaven was appointed a Commander of the Order of the British Empire in the 1989 New Year Honours, for services to medicine and the community, and a Distinguished Companion of the New Zealand Order of Merit in the 2005 New Year Honours, for services to persons with diabetes. He accepted re-designation as a Knight Companion of the New Zealand Order of Merit in August 2009 after the restoration of titular honours by the New Zealand government. In March 2009, Beaven was commemorated as one of the Twelve Local Heroes, and a bronze bust of him was unveiled outside the Christchurch Arts Centre. In 1990, he was awarded the New Zealand 1990 Commemoration Medal.

An advocate of the Mediterranean diet, Beaven helped establish the South Island wine industry, planting vineyards and olive groves around Christchurch and Banks Peninsula.

Beaven died fighting a house fire in his bach at Little Akaloa on Banks Peninsula. A memorial service for Beaven held in the Christchurch Town Hall on 19 December 2009 was attended by nearly 1000 people. At the memorial, the chair of the Health Research Council of New Zealand announced that the Emeritus Professor Sir Donald Ward Beaven Medal for Diabetes Research would be presented to the New Zealand researcher who makes the greatest contribution to diabetes research each year.

Beaven's second wife, Gillian, Lady Beaven, died in 2024.
