= Decanter Bay =

Place on Banks Peninsula, New Zealand

Decanter Bay Te Kakaho
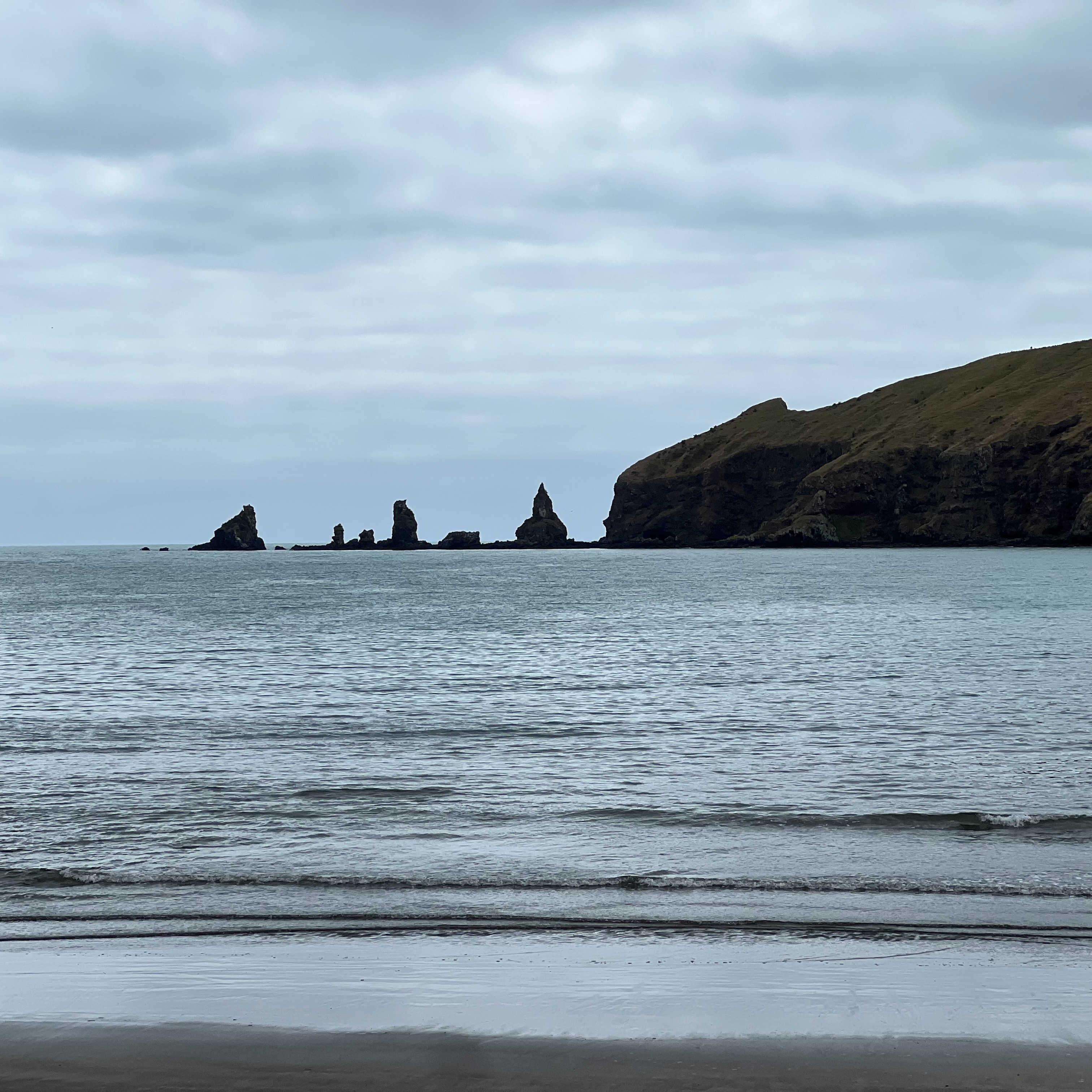
- The distinctive rocks at the head of bay are the origin of the name.

- Location of Decanter Bay on Banks Peninsula
- Coordinates: 43.653°S 172.999°E
- Country: New Zealand
- Region: Canterbury Region
- District: Christchurch City
- Ward: Banks Peninsula
- Local iwi: Ngāi Tahu

Decanter Bay is a bay on the northern coast of Banks Peninsula in Canterbury, New Zealand, between Little Akaloa and Menzies Bay.

== History ==
Prior to European settlement, the bay was the location of a Māori pā. In the Māori language the bay is called Te Kakaho, which references the knuckled stem of a reed.

The first European settler of the bay was Thomas Duncan, a disgraced Scottish lawyer who operated a dairy farm in the bay for five years. He had eloped with his ward, Eliza, and so was keeping a low profile for some time. He later moved to Lyttelton and then Christchurch, where he founded Duncan Cotterill Law in 1857 with his friend Henry Cotterill.

The name of the bay comes from a specific rock that was situated on the eastern headland of the bay. The rock had the shape of a decanter, but the 'stopper' at the top of the rock fell off in the 1880s due to erosion.

During the 1870s, the bay was the location of a steam sawmill that processed cut lumber from the bay. The settlement was large enough to have a post office, with twice-weekly deliveries of mail by sea from Lyttelton. After the bay had been deforested, the population dwindled.

== Geography ==
Decanter Bay is on the north-eastern shore of Banks Peninsula. The next bay, a short way to the south-east, is Little Akaloa / Whakaroa. Coastal features to the north-west include Squally Bay, Otohuao Head, and Menzies Bay.

Duncan Stream runs down the valley and meets the ocean on the northern side of the bay. The stream runs by the nearest major hilltop on the north side of the valley, simply called Graeme, which has an altitude of 446 metres (1,463 ft) above sea level. Vehicle access is via Decanter Bay Road, which crosses Brockworth Ridge from Little Akaloa. As of 2025 the road is unsealed from the top of Brockworth down into Decanter Bay. The land is privately owned, with waterfront access only by permission of the landowners.

== Ecology ==
The north-western side of the valley is a Site of Ecological Significance in the Christchurch District Plan. The area is a mixture of original native forest, tussock grassland, and cleared pasture. The valley is home to a number of at risk or naturally uncommon plants (including the fragrant tree-daisy Olearia fragrantissima, Veronica strictissima, Leptinella minor, Brachyglottis sciadophila, and Chenopodium allanii) and insects (including the locally-endemic Banks Peninsula green Cicada, Zelleria sphenota, Gadira petraula, and Bityla sericea).

Bird life in the valley includes bellbirds (korimako), grey warblers (riroriro), Swamp harrier (kāhu), fantails (pīwakawaka) and silvereyes (tauhou).

Like many bays on Banks Peninsula, Decanter Bay is a habitat for endangered Hector's dolphins. A 2024 acoustic study found that Decanter Bay logged more dolphin activity than other nearby bays.
