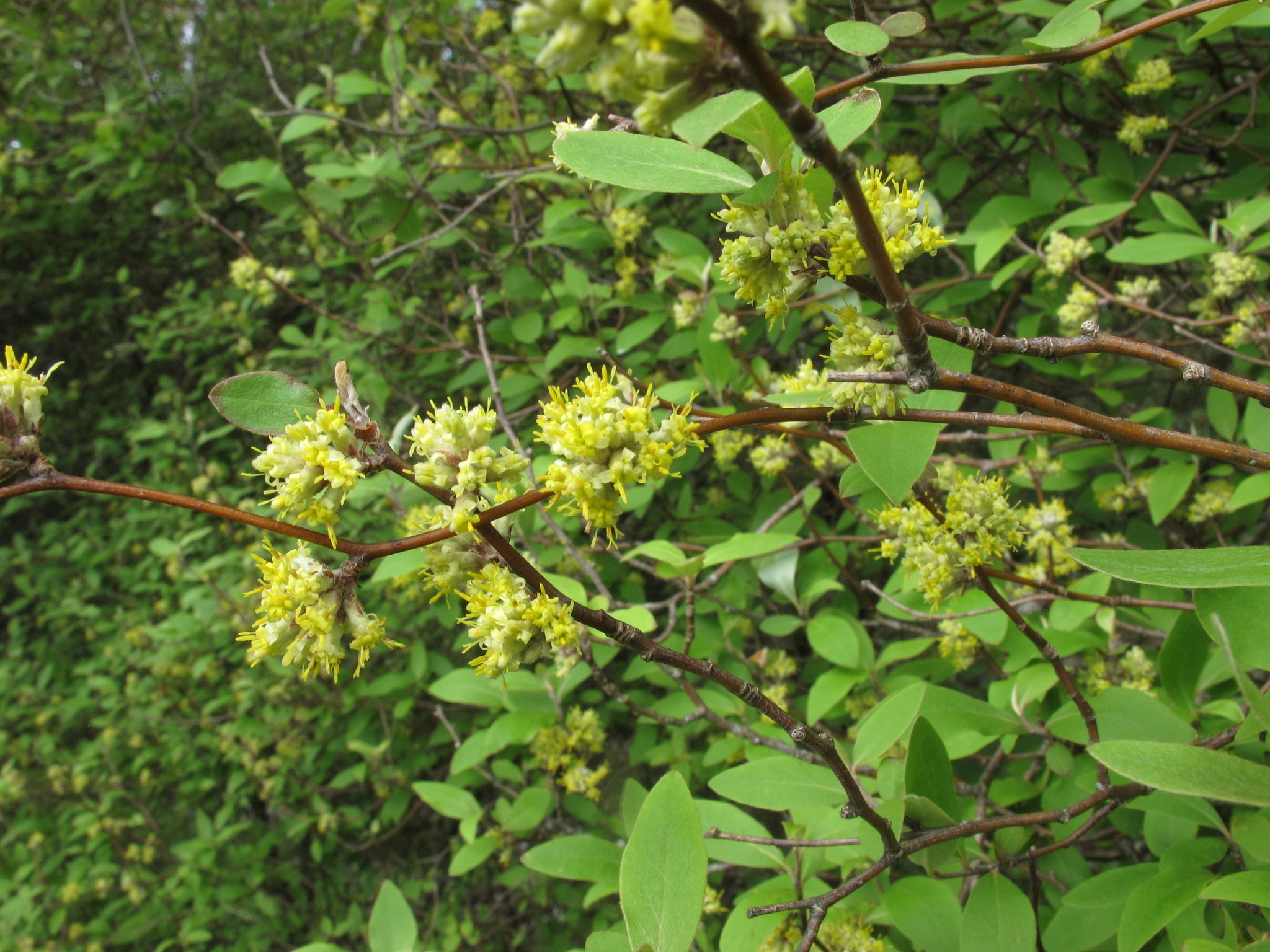

Conservation status
- Near Threatened (IUCN 2.3)

Scientific classification
- Kingdom: Plantae
- Clade: Tracheophytes
- Clade: Angiosperms
- Clade: Eudicots
- Clade: Asterids
- Order: Asterales
- Family: Asteraceae
- Genus: Shawia
- Species: O. fragrantissima

Binomial name
- Olearia fragrantissima Petrie

= Olearia fragrantissima =

Species of flowering plant

Olearia fragrantissima is a species of flowering plant in the family Asteraceae. It is a deciduous shrub and is found only in New Zealand. It is threatened by habitat loss.

== Description ==
The common name is the 'fragrant tree daisy', and the scent is similar to ripe nectarines, apricots, peaches, or fruit salad. It flowers between October and February.

It forms a small tree up to 12 metres (39 ft) in height, with grey-ish brown bark that peels in long strips.

== Distribution and habitat ==
Olearia fragrantissima is found only in New Zealand, and is sparsely distributed along the eastern South Island. Its northern-most range is Banks Peninsula, with a population found at Decanter Bay. It prefers lower coastal environments, and is found on the fringes of shrubland where there is broken canopy.
