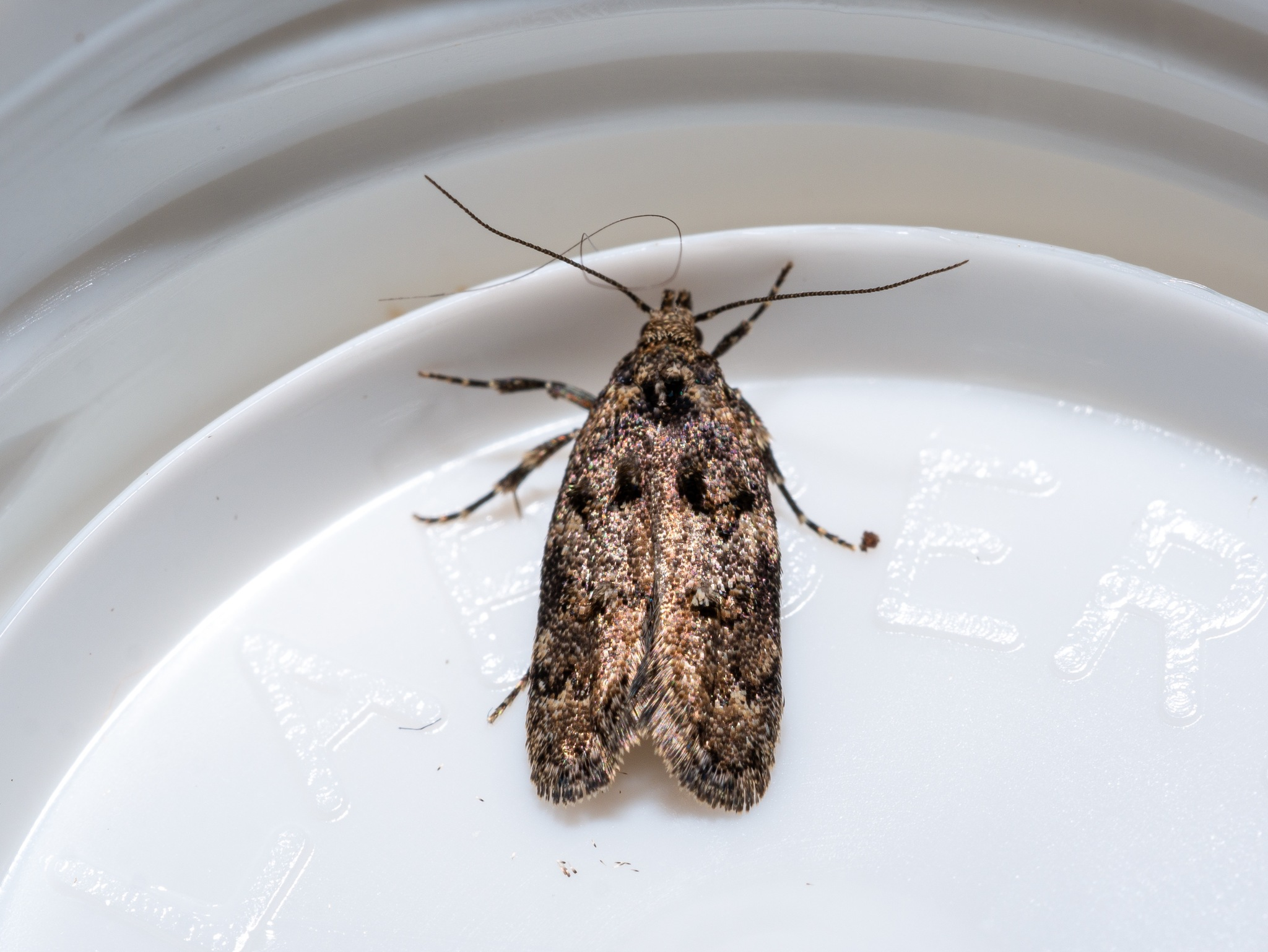

Scientific classification
- Kingdom: Animalia
- Phylum: Arthropoda
- Class: Insecta
- Order: Lepidoptera
- Family: Oecophoridae
- Genus: Trachypepla
- Species: T. anastrella

Binomial name
- Trachypepla anastrella Meyrick, 1883

= Trachypepla anastrella =

Species of moth endemic to New Zealand

Trachypepla anastrella is a species of moth in the family Oecophoridae. It is endemic to New Zealand and has been observed in the North and South Islands. Larvae are leaf litter feeders from the host plant Olearia fragrantissima and adults are on the wing from December until March.

== Taxonomy ==
This species was first described in 1883 by Edward Meyrick and named Trachypepla anastrella. Later that same year Meyrick gave another abbreviated description of the species. In 1884 Meyrick gave a much fuller description of T. anastrellla. In 1928 George Hudson discussed and illustrated this species. Hudson would go on to discuss and illustrate this species again in his 1939 publication and state that the description and illustration given in his 1928 publication related to Euchersadaula tristis. J. S. Dugdale confirmed that the 1928 illustration of that species by Hudson is of the species Euchersadaula tristis. The male lectotype specimen, collected in reserved bush and forest in Dunedin, is held at the Natural History Museum, London.

== Description ==
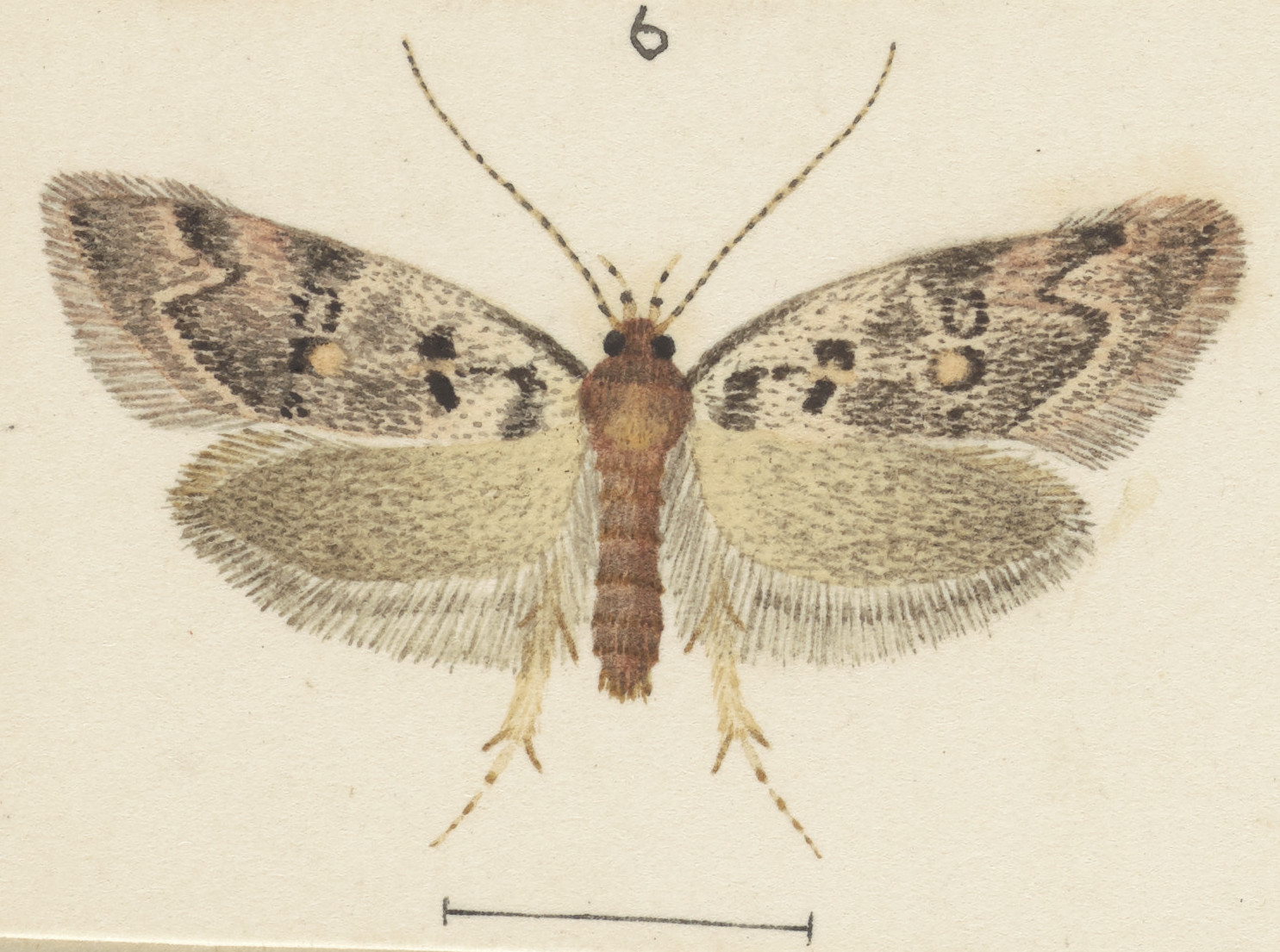
Illustration by G. Hudson, 1939.

Meyrick described T. anastrella as follows:

Male. — 11 1/2-14 mm. Head, palpi, and thorax dark fuscous, somewhat mixed with whitish-ochreous. Antennae dark fuscous. Abdomen fuscous. Legs dark fuscous, middle and posterior tibiae with ochreous-whitish central and apical rings, all tarsi with ochreous-whitish rings at apex of joints. Forewings moderate, costa moderately arched, slightly sinuate in middle, apex rounded, hindmargin very obliquely rounded; fuscous or ochreous- fuscous, coarsely irrorated with dark fuscous or blackish; sometimes a suffused oblique ochreous transverse spot almost at base; a tuft of raised scales at base; a cloudy blackish transverse line from 1/4 of costa to 1/3 of inner margin, tolerably rectangularly angulated in middle, preceded by two large tufts of raised scales above and below middle; beyond this the ground-colour is suffusedly paler or mixed with ochreous-whitish towards costa; costa suffusedly dark fuscous towards middle; two tufts of raised scales in disc beyond middle; a very ill-defined dark fuscous transverse line from 4/5 of costa to anal angle, angulated inwards beneath costa, sometimes followed on costa by an ochreous-whitish spot : cilia fuscous, with two cloudy blackish lines. Hindwings dark fuscous-grey; cilia fuscous, with a cloudy darker line.

== Distribution ==
This species is endemic to New Zealand. It has been observed in the North and South Islands as well as on Mokopuna and Matiu / Somes Islands.

== Behaviour ==
This species is on the wing from December until March.

== Habitat and hosts ==
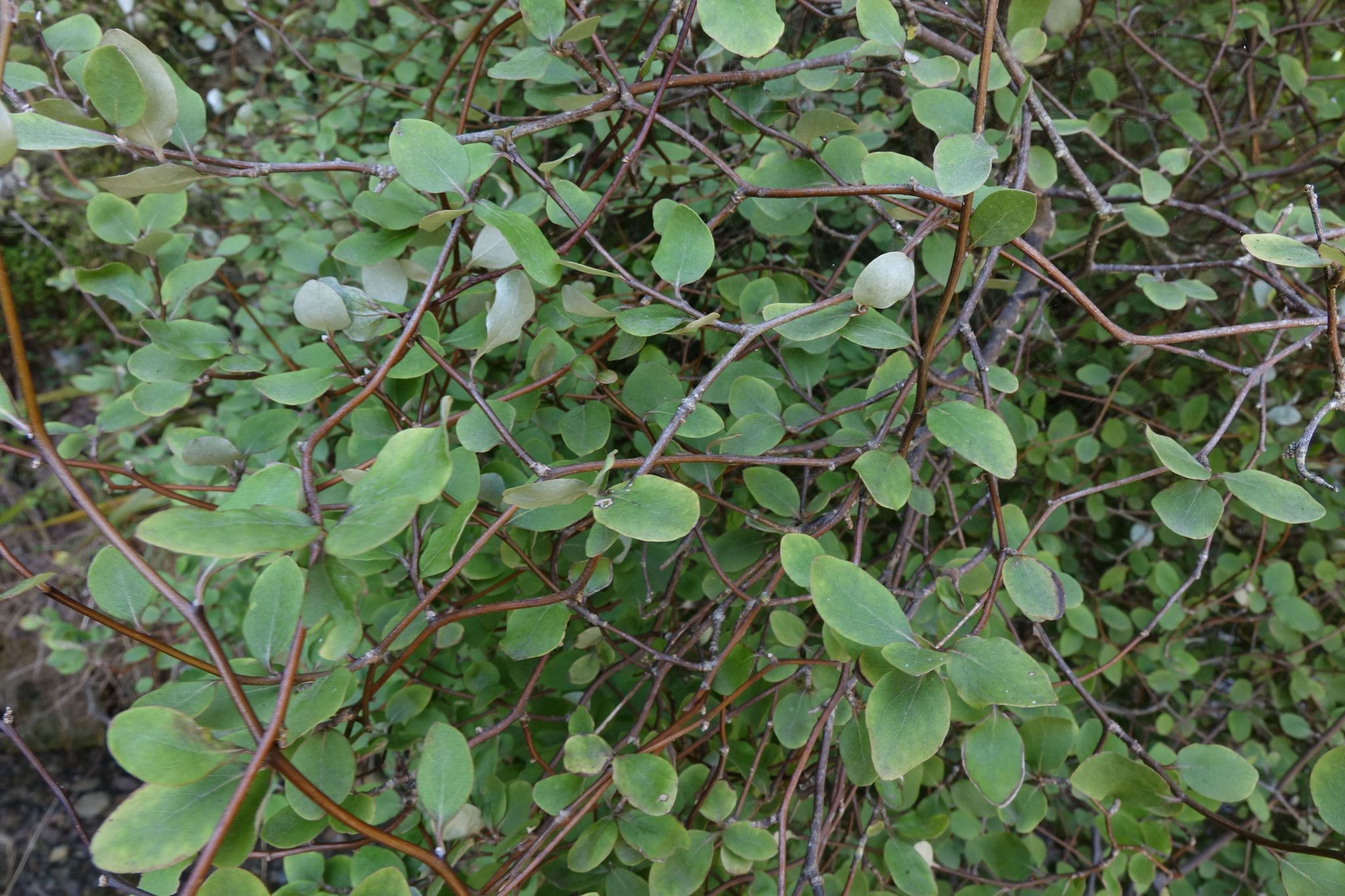
Olearia fragrantissima, larval host plant.

This species has been observed living in hind dune habitat on Kaitorete Spit. Larvae of this species feed on the leaf litter of the "near threatened" plant species Olearia fragrantissima.
