= Shawi =

Shawi may refer to the following links:

- Shawi language, Peru

== Species ==
- Panthera shawi
- Meriones shawi
- Baltia shawi

== See also ==
- Shawia (disambiguation)
