= St Luke's Church, Little Akaloa =

- St Luke's Church, Little Akaloa
- 43°40′33.72″S 172°59′51.93″E
- Location: 1280 Chorlton Rd, Little Akaloa
- Country: New Zealand
- Denomination: Anglican

History
- Consecrated: 6 December 1906

Architecture
- Functional status: Active
- Architect: John Henry Menzies
- Architectural type: Church
- Style: Gothic Revival
- Years built: 1905–1906

Administration
- Diocese: Christchurch

Heritage New Zealand – Category 1
- Official name: St Luke's Church (Anglican)
- Designated: 17 December 1993
- Reference no.: 7094

St Luke's Church is a heritage-listed Anglican church and associated churchyard at Little Akaloa on Banks Peninsula, in the Canterbury Region of New Zealand. Built during 1905–1906, the building has a strong connection with English-born John Henry Menzies, who not only designed and built it but also financed its construction. The church was registered by the New Zealand Historic Places Trust as a Historic Place Category I in 1993 and is notable for its extensive usage of Māori art forms, carved by Menzies, in its interior.

== Background ==
The first European settlers on Banks Peninsula, in the Canterbury Region of New Zealand, began arriving from the 1840s. Little Akaloa was one of many bays in which there was a small farming community. In 1856 the Bishop of New Zealand George Selwyn held the first service in the community under a tree and a few years later a small, one-room school building was erected in which services were held on Sundays. In due course this was extended and in 1882 it became a dedicated church, consecrated as St Luke's. However, this was still not fit for purpose and the building was not well maintained.

== History ==
John Henry Menzies was a English immigrant to New Zealand, who took up farming in Little Akaloa in 1877. In 1904 he offered £400 towards the construction of a new church, on the basis the local residents would contribute another £200. They swiftly raised more than needed, over £300. However, when the construction was put up for tender, it transpired the total amount was insufficient and Menzies took it upon himself to increase his financial commitment. He also undertook to carry out its construction, which commenced in 1905. The local community also contributed with free labour and cartage.

The new St Luke's Church was consecrated on 17 December 1906, with the Bishop of Christchurch Churchill Julius leading the well-attended service. At the time, its cost of construction was reported as being £1,100. Damaged in an earthquake in December 1922, work was done on the building for sake of structural reinforcement. It underwent a restoration in 1955, the completion of which was recognised with a service held by the Bishop of Christchurch, Reverend A. H. Warren.

== Design ==
St Luke's Church and its churchyard, with access through a lychgate, is positioned on a rise overlooking Little Akaloa Bay. Designed in the Gothic Revival style, it is constructed largely of un-reinforced concrete, with shingle from a nearby beach carted to the site. Pāua shell was applied to the exterior concrete coating as it was setting. Relatively large given the small size of the Little Akaloa community, the building has a substantially cruciform floor plan; in addition to the nave, the building has transepts, a vestry wing, and an entrance porch. A belfry tower, with a bellcote capped with a pyramidal spire, is provided to the south side of the building. The gable roof was originally clad with tōtara shingles but these have been replaced with slate tiles.

The outline of the Gothic-arched door and windows of the church are defined by stone dressings. Four sets of lancet windows are provided to each end of the building, and these include Scottish-sourced leadlights arranged in geometric patterns.

In the interior, the walls are lined with Oamaru stone and of limestone, sourced from Mount Somers. The altar, pulpit, and font, which was donated by Menzies's wife in memory of the couple's deceased children, are also of limestone, as is the communion rail. The roof space is lined mostly with rimu timber.

The interior of St Luke's Church, showing the carving of the church furniture at the altar

Unusually for a European-designed church and congregation, this includes extensive Māori art forms. These were carved by Menzies, who was keenly interested in Māori art. Holding what was then a widespread belief that the Māori population was in decline, he saw his work as helping to preserve the art for future generations. Consequently, the pilasters, corbels and cornices are all carved with traditional Māori motifs while the roof space includes kōwhaiwhai painting. The church furniture receives similar treatment; for example, the font includes nīkau palm fronds at its base in addition to Māori and Celtic motifs while the lectern includes Māori patterns.

== Legacy ==
St Luke's Church remains in use as part of the Community Church of Akaroa Banks Peninsula of the Anglican Diocese of Christchurch.

Located on Chorlton Road in Little Akaloa, St Luke's Church was listed by the Historic Places Trust as a Historic Place Category 1 on 17 December 1993. A factor in its heritage listing is its usage of Māori decorative elements that were designed by a European settler for a religious structure primarily intended for use by European settlers.
