= Jed River =

Coordinates: 42°51′S 173°19′E

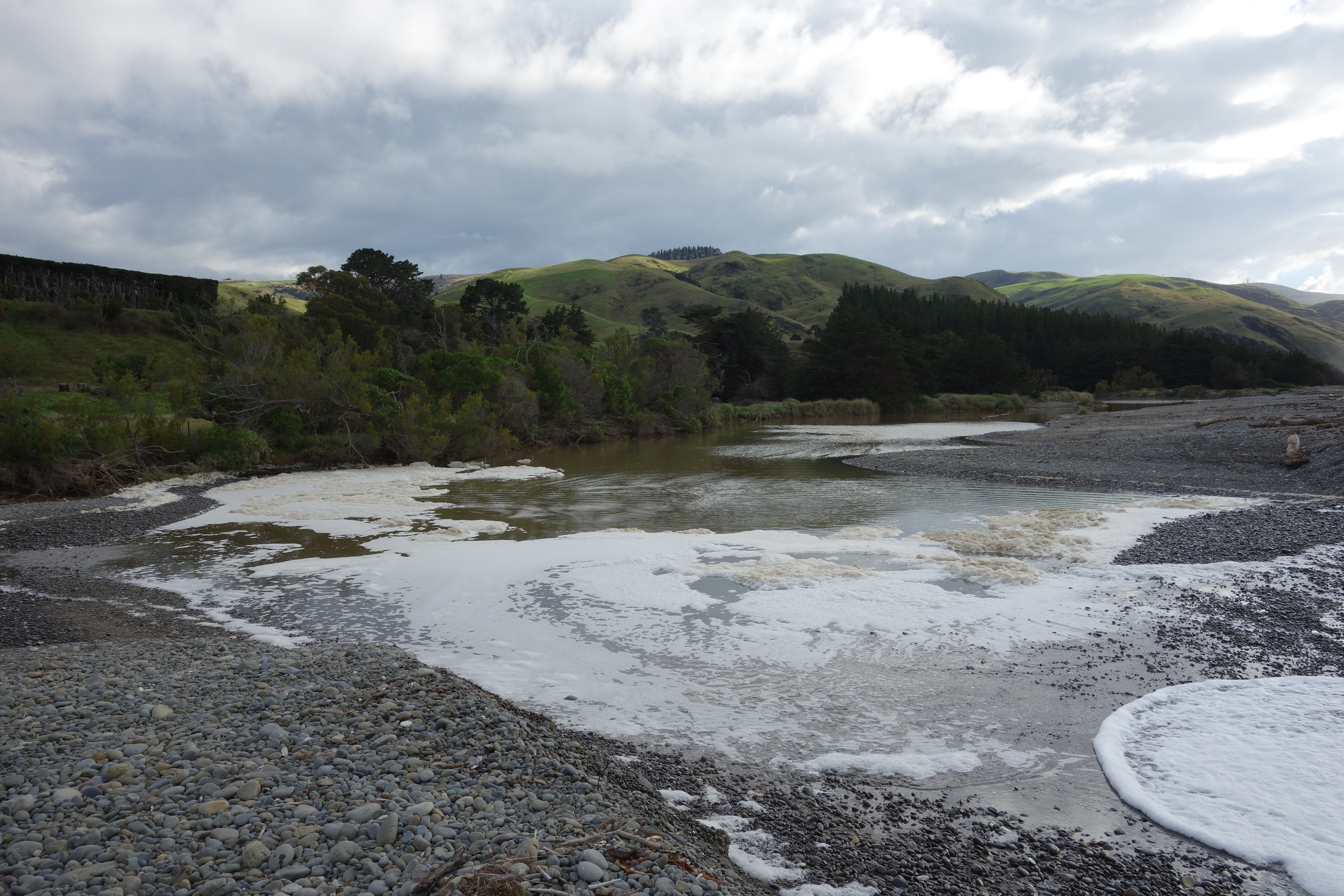
- Mouth of the Jed River

Location
- Country: New Zealand

Physical characteristics
- Length: 16 km (9.9 mi)

The Jed River is a river of New Zealand's South Island. It flows to the Pacific Ocean close to the town of Cheviot adjacent to Gore Bay. It combines with Buxton Creek behind a rocky beach before draining through the shingle. The waterways break through the rocks after heavy rain and establish a direct outflow into the sea.

== See also ==
- List of rivers of New Zealand
