= Shawia =

Shawia may refer to:

- the Shawia people
- the Shawia language
- Shawia (plant), a genus of flowering plants

== See also ==
- Shawa, village in the Lower Dir District of Khyber-Pakhtunkhwa, Pakistan
- Shawi (disambiguation)
