= Banks Peninsula =

Peninsula south-east of Christchurch, New Zealand

Banks Peninsula Te Pātaka o Rākaihautū
- Peninsula
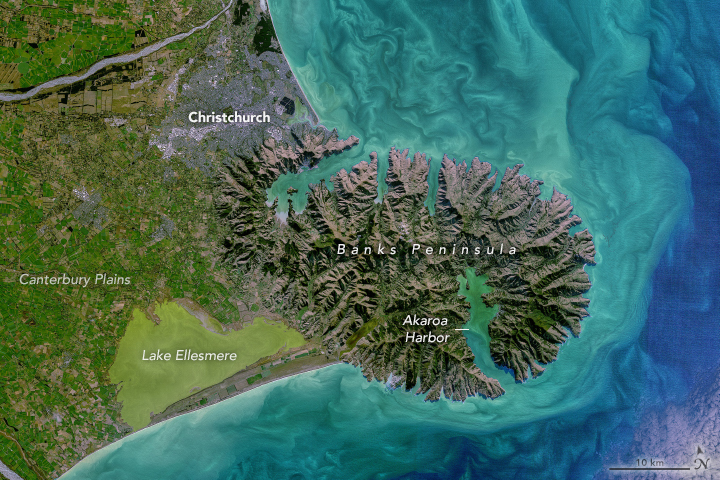
- Banks Peninsula and Christchurch in a 2021 NASA satellite photo

- Location within New Zealand
- Coordinates: 43°45′S 172°51′E
- Location: South Island, New Zealand
- Water bodies: Pacific Ocean
- Age: 15 million years
- Formed by: Volcanism
- Geology: Eroded remnants of Banks Peninsula Volcano

Area
  - Total: 1,200 km^{2} (460 sq mi)
- Highest elevation: 919 metres (3,015 ft) (Mt Herbert / Te Ahu Patiki)

Banks Peninsula bays

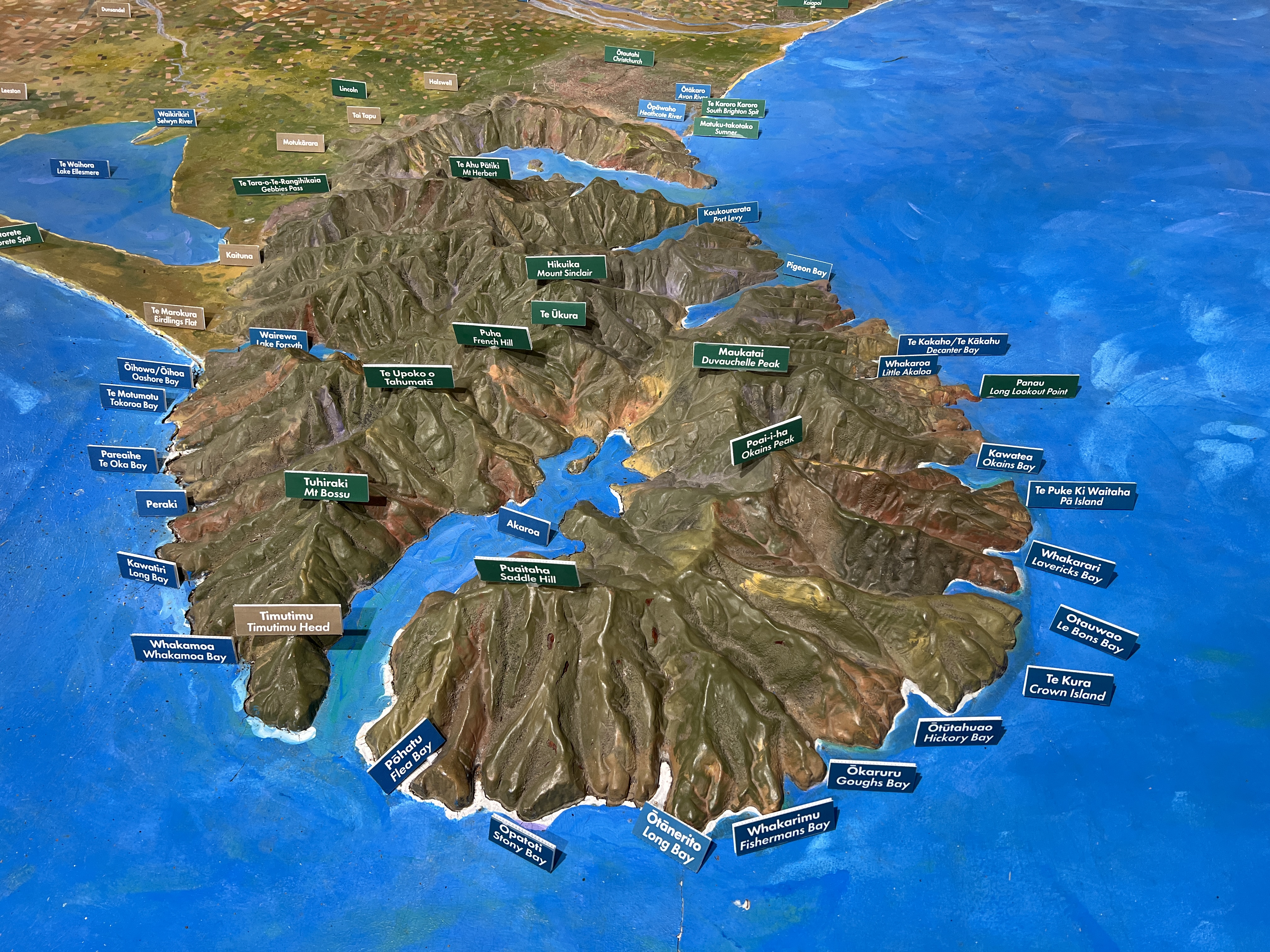
Model in Okains Bay Museum

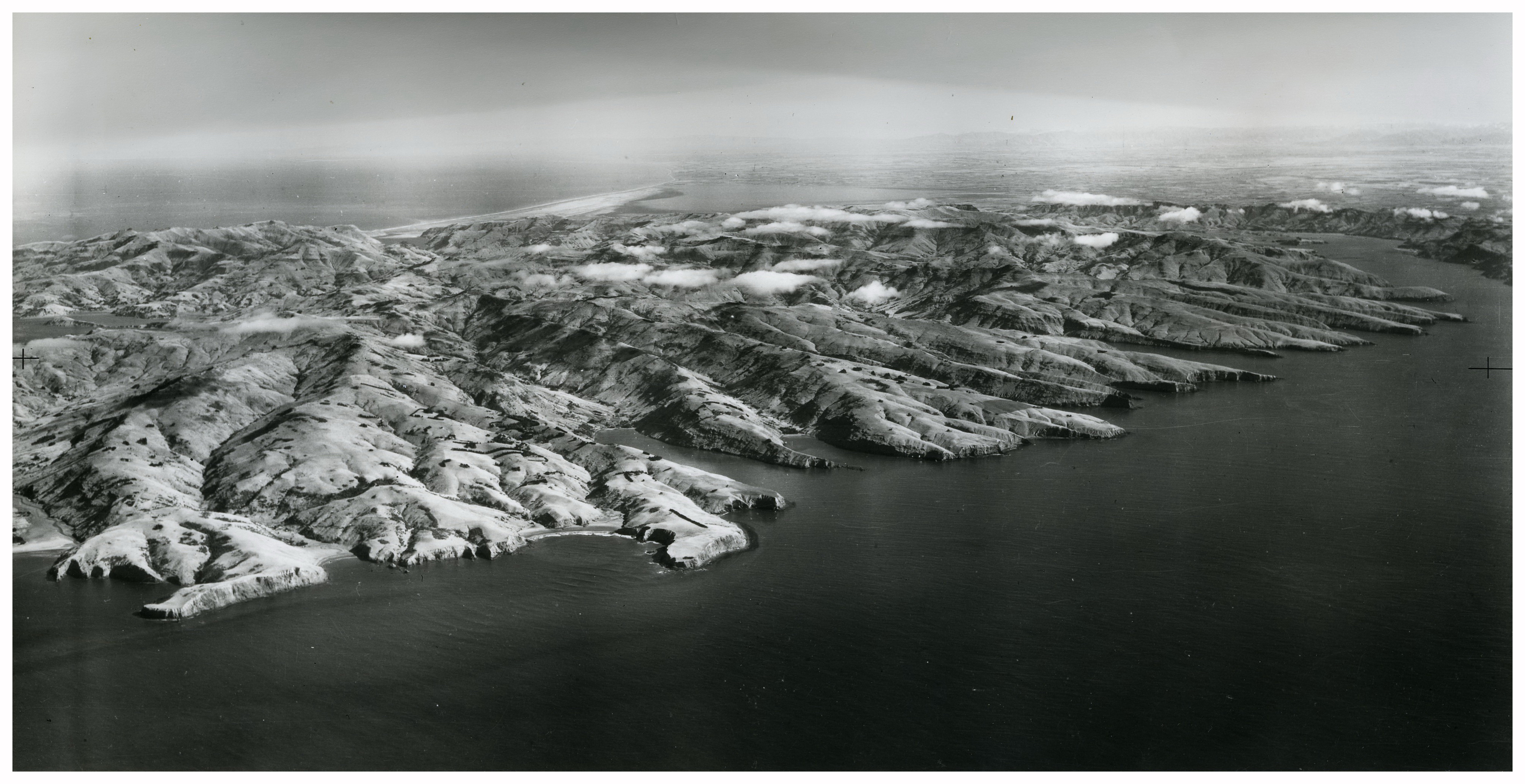
Banks Peninsula, with Lyttelton Harbour / Whakaraupō on the right and Lake Ellesmere / Te Waihora in the background

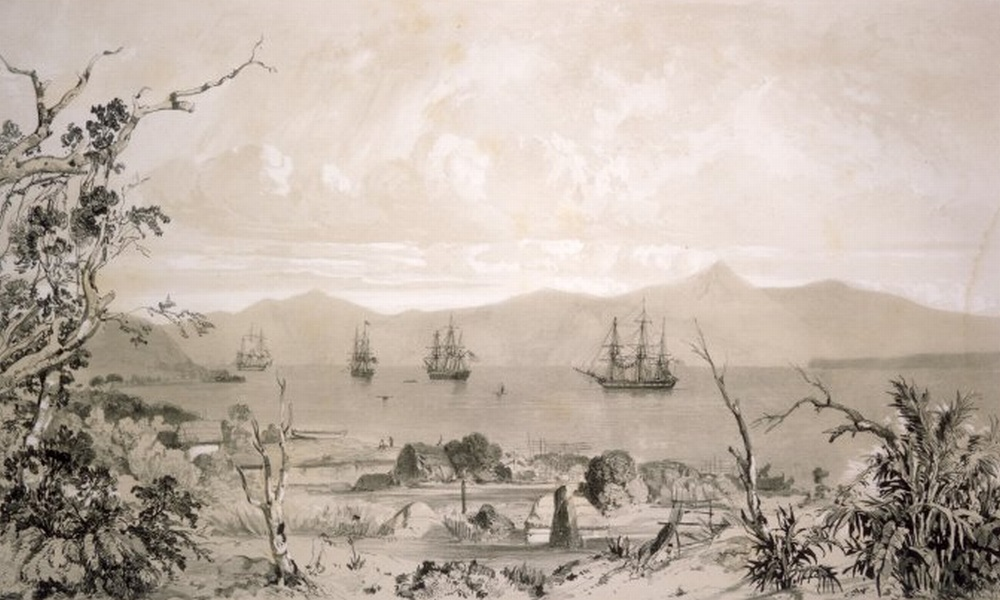
European ships, possibly French, in Akaroa in the early 19th century

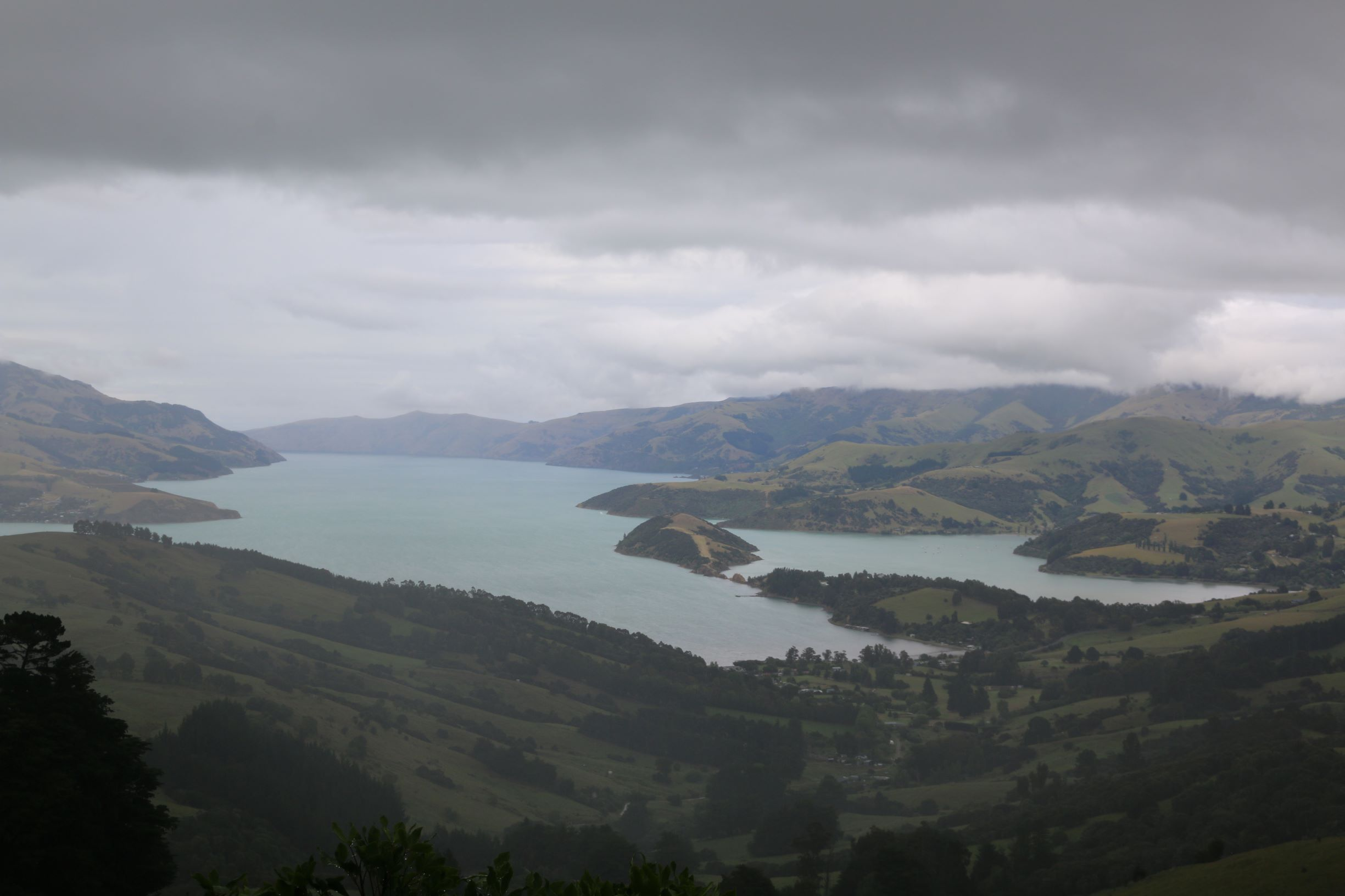
Akaroa Harbour, Banks Peninsula with storm clouds overhead (December 2020)

Banks Peninsula (Māori: Te Pātaka o Rākaihautū) is a rocky peninsula on the east coast of the South Island of New Zealand that was formed by two now-extinct volcanoes. It has an area of approximately 1,200 square kilometres (450 sq mi). It includes two large deep-water harbours – Lyttelton Harbour and Akaroa Harbour – and many smaller bays and coves. The South Island's largest city, Christchurch, is immediately north of the peninsula, which is administered by Christchurch City Council. The main settlements are Lyttelton and Akaroa. The peninsula's economy is based on fisheries, farming and tourism.

Māori were the first people to visit, and settle, the peninsula. The already sparse population was reduced further following massacres by raiding parties of North Island Māori in 1830 and 1832. In 1770, explorer James Cook became the first European to sight the peninsula, which he mistook for an island, naming it after his ship's botanist Joseph Banks. From the 1830s, European whalers set up shore-based stations in some of the bays and harbours. European interest in the permanent settlement of the area developed in the 1830s, and in 1840 a small French settlement was established in Akaroa Harbour, which lasted for around ten years. In the late 1840s, the Canterbury Association in England chose the central South Island as the site for a model English colony with Christchurch as its capital. Banks Peninsula was not part of the original land purchase for the colony, but Port Cooper (now known as Lyttelton Harbour) was to be its port and point of entry. The first 800 settlers arrived in December 1850.

Lyttelton is the working port of Christchurch. Leisure and environmental activities are popular on the peninsula.

== History ==
=== Prehistory – Māori period ===
According to tradition, the first Māori settlers of the area now known as Banks Peninsula were the Waitaha, led by their founding ancestor Rākaihautū. The Māori name for the peninsula is Te Pātaka o Rākaihautū (The Storehouse of Rākaihautū) in recognition of his deeds and the abundance of mahinga kai (foods of the forests, sea, rivers and skies). They were followed by Kāti Māmoe, and then the Ngāi Tahu hapū Ngāi Tūhaitara, who arrived in the 1730s.

=== 1770–1832 – Captain Cook; limited European interest; Te Rauparaha and Māori massacres ===
The first European sighting of the peninsula was on 17 February 1770 by Captain James Cook and crew during Cook's first circumnavigation of New Zealand. Cook described the land as "of a circular figure ... of a very broken uneven surface and [having] more the appearance of barrenness than fertility." Deceived by the outline of higher land behind the peninsula, Cook mistook it for an island and named it "Banks Island" in honour of Endeavour's botanist, Joseph Banks. Distracted by a phantom sighting of land to the southeast, Cook then ordered Endeavour away to the south without exploring more closely.

In 1809, Captain Samuel Chase, in the sealer Pegasus, corrected Cook's charts by determining that "Banks Island" was in fact a peninsula. His first officer, William Stewart, charted this area of the coast. Pegasus Bay is named after their vessel.

In 1830, the Māori settlement at Takapūneke was sacked and the local Ngāi Tahu chief, Tama-i-hara-nui, captured by Ngāti Toa war chief Te Rauparaha, with the assistance of the captain of the British brig Elizabeth, John Stewart. This was a revenge attack for the killing of several Ngāti Toa chiefs at Kaiapoi Pā in 1829. Ngāti Toa returned in 1832 to sack Kaiapoi Pā and Ōnawe Pā. It was partly as a result of these massacres that the British authorities sent James Busby, as official British Resident, to New Zealand in 1832, and one of the factors that led to the Treaty of Waitangi.

=== 1830–1848 – Whalers, the French, Britain asserts sovereignty ===
During the 1830s, a few vagrant settlers from Britain and America lived on and near the peninsula, with some taking Māori wives. Several European whaling bases were established on Banks Peninsula. In 1838, Captain Jean François Langlois, a French whaler, decided that Akaroa would make a good settlement to service whaling ships and made a provisional purchase of land in "the greater Banks Peninsula" from 12 Kāi Tahu chiefs. A deposit of commodities in the value of £6 was paid and a further £234 worth of commodities was to be paid at a later period. He returned to France, advertised for settlers to go to New Zealand, and ceded his interest in the land to the Nanto-Bordelaise Company, of which he became a part owner. On 9 March 1840 he set sail for New Zealand with a group of French and German families aboard the ship Comte de Paris, with the intention of forming a French colony on a French South Island of New Zealand. By the time Langlois and his colonists arrived at Banks Peninsula in August 1840, many Māori had already signed the Treaty of Waitangi (the signatories including two chiefs at Akaroa in May) and New Zealand's first British Governor, William Hobson, had declared British sovereignty over the whole of New Zealand. On hearing of the French plan for colonisation, Hobson quickly dispatched HMS Britomart from the Bay of Islands to Akaroa with police magistrates on board. While Langlois and his colonists sheltered from unfavourable winds at Pigeon Bay on the other side of the peninsula, the British raised their flag at Greens Point between Akaroa and Takapūneke and courts of law convened to assert British sovereignty over the South Island. (Note: Actions of authority are used to cement a claim of sovereignty. Here, this included the presence of a British ship in the harbour with flag raised, police officers, and the sitting of a magistrates' court (however basic) in Akaroa. This was a conscious effort taken by Hobson, the NZ governor.) The French colonists arrived in Akaroa Harbour on 18 August and established a settlement centred on the present-day site of Akaroa. Given that the French colonists had set out for New Zealand on the assumption that they owned the land, the New Zealand authorities made a grant of 30,000 acres to the Nanto-Bordelaise Company, which ceded all rights to the peninsula for £4,500.

=== 1848–1876 – The Canterbury Association and the Canterbury Province ===
During the 1840s, the peninsula and the Canterbury Plains beyond were considered for colonisation, but it took until 1848 for the Canterbury Association chief surveyor Captain Joseph Thomas to survey the surrounding plains and prepare for the arrival of the Canterbury pilgrims in December 1850.

The Canterbury Province was abolished at midnight on 31 December 1876.

=== 1877–2006 – Akaroa County and Banks Peninsula District ===
Akaroa County, which covered most of Banks Peninsula, was one of the counties of New Zealand established in 1877. The council first met in Akaroa courthouse on 4 January 1877. In 1880 new offices were opened at Duvauchelle. An area around Lyttelton was separated off in 1902 to form Mount Herbert County. Counties were abolished in 1989 and most of the peninsula then came within the Banks Peninsula District, which was itself abolished in 2006.

== Geography ==
=== Geology ===
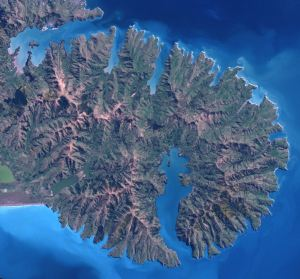
Banks Peninsula has a roughly circular shape, with many bays and two deep harbours.

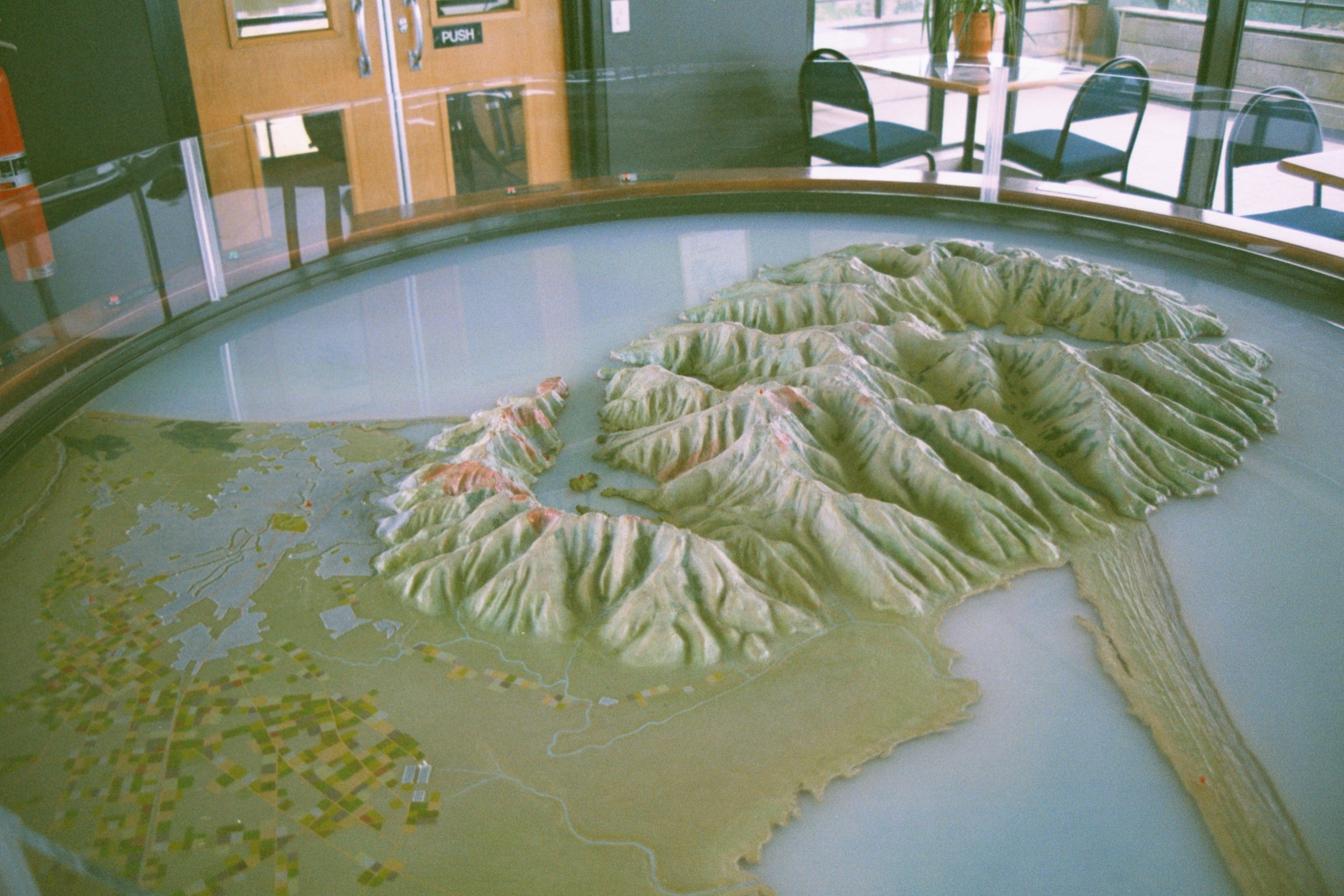
Model of Banks Peninsula, showing the mountainous nature otherwise atypical of the Christchurch area.

Banks Peninsula forms the most prominent volcanic feature of the South Island, similar to – but more than twice as large as – the older Dunedin Volcano (Otago Peninsula and Harbour) 350 kilometres (220 mi) to the southwest. Geologically, the peninsula comprises the eroded remnants of two large shield volcanoes (Lyttelton formed first, then Akaroa), and the smaller Mount Herbert Volcanic Group. These formed due to intraplate volcanism between approximately eleven and eight million years ago (Miocene) on a continental crust. The peninsula formed as offshore islands, with the volcanoes reaching to about 1,500 m above sea level. Two dominant craters formed Lyttelton and Akaroa Harbours.

The Canterbury Plains were formed from the erosion of the Southern Alps (an extensive and high mountain range caused by the meeting of the Indo-Australian and Pacific tectonic plates) and from the alluvial fans created by large braided rivers. These plains reach their widest point where they meet the hilly sub-region of Banks Peninsula. A layer of loess, a rather unstable fine silt deposited by the foehn winds that bluster across the plains, covers the northern and western flanks of the peninsula. The portion of crater rim lying between Lyttelton Harbour / Whakaraupō and Christchurch city forms the Port Hills.

This low-lying lake-filled isthmus is responsible for James Cook mistaking Banks Peninsula for an island. From a geological perspective, Cook was not so much incorrect, as late. For 15 million years, Banks Peninsula existed as a volcanic island, and it was only in the last 20,000 years that an isthmus to the Canterbury Plains emerged, transforming the island into a peninsula.

=== Climate ===
Climate data for Banks Peninsula (Le Bons Bay), elevation 238 m (781 ft), (1991–2020)
| Month | Jan | Feb | Mar | Apr | May | Jun | Jul | Aug | Sep | Oct | Nov | Dec | Year |
|---|---|---|---|---|---|---|---|---|---|---|---|---|---|
| Mean daily maximum °C (°F) | 19.1 (66.4) | 18.9 (66.0) | 17.4 (63.3) | 15.2 (59.4) | 13.2 (55.8) | 10.9 (51.6) | 10.0 (50.0) | 10.5 (50.9) | 12.4 (54.3) | 14.0 (57.2) | 15.4 (59.7) | 17.5 (63.5) | 14.5 (58.2) |
| Daily mean °C (°F) | 15.4 (59.7) | 15.4 (59.7) | 14.1 (57.4) | 12.2 (54.0) | 10.4 (50.7) | 8.4 (47.1) | 7.6 (45.7) | 7.9 (46.2) | 9.3 (48.7) | 10.5 (50.9) | 11.9 (53.4) | 13.9 (57.0) | 11.4 (52.5) |
| Mean daily minimum °C (°F) | 11.7 (53.1) | 11.9 (53.4) | 10.9 (51.6) | 9.2 (48.6) | 7.6 (45.7) | 5.8 (42.4) | 5.1 (41.2) | 5.3 (41.5) | 6.1 (43.0) | 6.9 (44.4) | 8.0 (46.4) | 10.3 (50.5) | 8.2 (46.8) |
| Average rainfall mm (inches) | 36.6 (1.44) | 35.7 (1.41) | 40.6 (1.60) | 49.7 (1.96) | 70.0 (2.76) | 70.1 (2.76) | 67.2 (2.65) | 70.1 (2.76) | 46.3 (1.82) | 54.9 (2.16) | 50.3 (1.98) | 47.7 (1.88) | 639.2 (25.18) |
Source: NIWA

=== Towns ===
==== Lyttelton ====
Lyttelton is an historic port town in Lyttelton Harbour. The colonial port has expanded destination for cruise ships as well as large goods-transport vessels.

==== Akaroa ====
Akaroa is a main township of Akaroa harbour. Many people have a holiday house at Akaroa or visit for a holiday or day trip from Christchurch. The township began as a whaling port, and over ten years from 1835 to 1845, southern right whale were hunted to near extinction. Following the decline of the whaling industry, sawmilling and cutting cocksfoot grass emerged as a primary industry, and subsequently it became a rural hub, servicing sheep and beef farmers. Today, Akaroa's economy is closely tied to the environment, with tourism – particularly marine nature tourism – serving as its principal source of income.

==== Little River ====
Little River is a small town at the end of the Little River Rail Trail. There are several art galleries, a camp ground, rugby club and primary school there. The area is known to Māori as Wairewa.

==== Wainui ====
Wainui is a settlement of mostly holiday houses on the Akaroa harbour.

Wainui can mean 'big water' or 'big river' or 'big bay'. Wainui was once home to a large Ngāti Māmoe settlement. Wainui has important associations for Ngāi Tahu as the bay was then claimed by Te Ruahikihiki for Ngāi Tahu. He made his claim when he landed at Wainui and dug for fern roots there. (This was one of the many traditional ways to claim land). In Ngāi Tahu legend, Tuhiraki (Mt Bossu), which lies behind Wainui, is the resting place of the kō (digging stick) of Rakaihautū. He used this digging stick to dig out many of the South Island lakes.

In 1856, the Wainui Māori Reserve was established and set aside 432 acres for the Ngāi Tarewa Hapū of Ngāi Tahu. In the 1857 census, there was 40 people living there but by 1861, this had declined to 20 people.

A post office was established in 1874, telephone office in 1875, school in 1885 and Presbyterian Church in 1911.

==== Duvauchelle ====
Duvauchelle is a small town at the head of the Akaroa harbour.

==== Diamond Harbour ====
Diamond Harbour is on Banks Peninsula.

=== Bays ===
The inland valleys of the Port Hills known as McCormacks Bay and Moncks Bay are bays of the Avon Heathcote Estuary, rather that coastal bays of Banks Peninsula. Working around the coast from north to south one encounters:

==== Sumner Bay ====
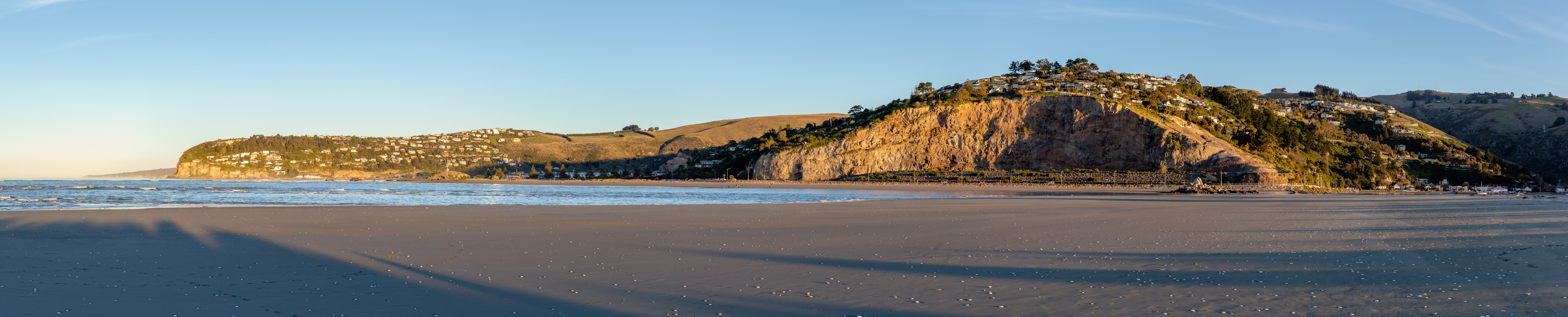
Sumner Bay from Rapanui to Scarborough

Sumner Bay marks the coastal transition from the long sandy beach of Pegasus Bay and the lowlands of the Canterbury Plains to the rocky cliffs of Banks Peninsula. While Sumner is politically and socially considered a suburb of Christchurch, the high Clifton cliffs and the post of volcanic rock on the beach, known locally as Rapanui, or Shag Rock, mark the place where the coastal plains meet the peninsula.

==== Taylors Mistake ====
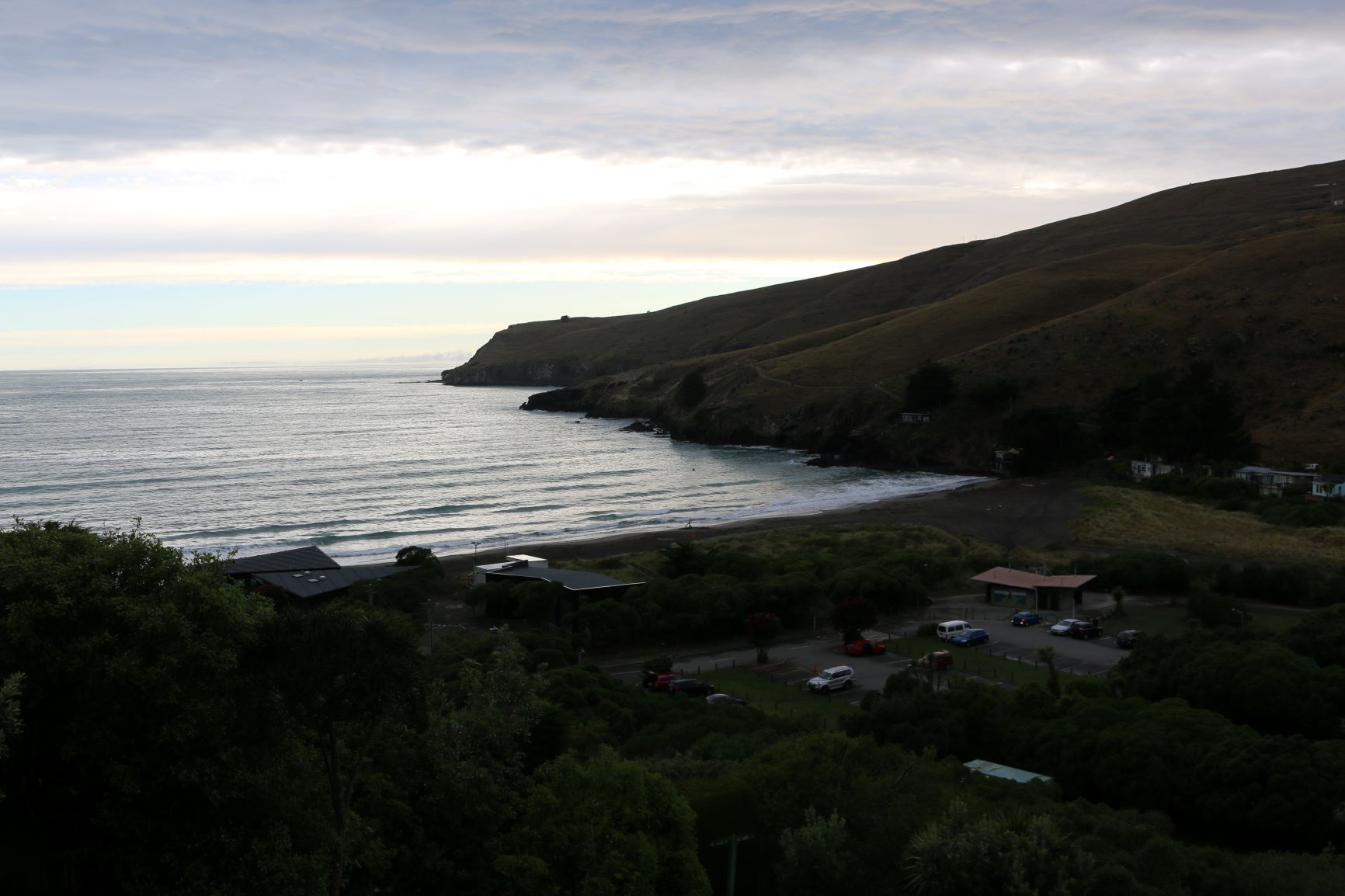
Taylors Mistake (2021)

Taylors Mistake is a Christchurch swimming beach with a number of holiday houses lining the bay. Originally, it was known as Vincent's Bay as a result of a Captain John Vincent wrecking his schooner in the bay. It became known as Taylors Mistake in 1853 after another ship wreck in the bay. This time, a Captain Samuel Taylor wrecked his cutter named Hawk at night time. Taylors Mistake is known as Te One-poto in Māori.

==== Lyttelton Harbour/Whakaraupō ====
Lyttelton Harbour / Whakaraupō is a harbour within Banks Peninsula. Within the harbour lies Ōtamahua / Quail Island and Ripapa Island.

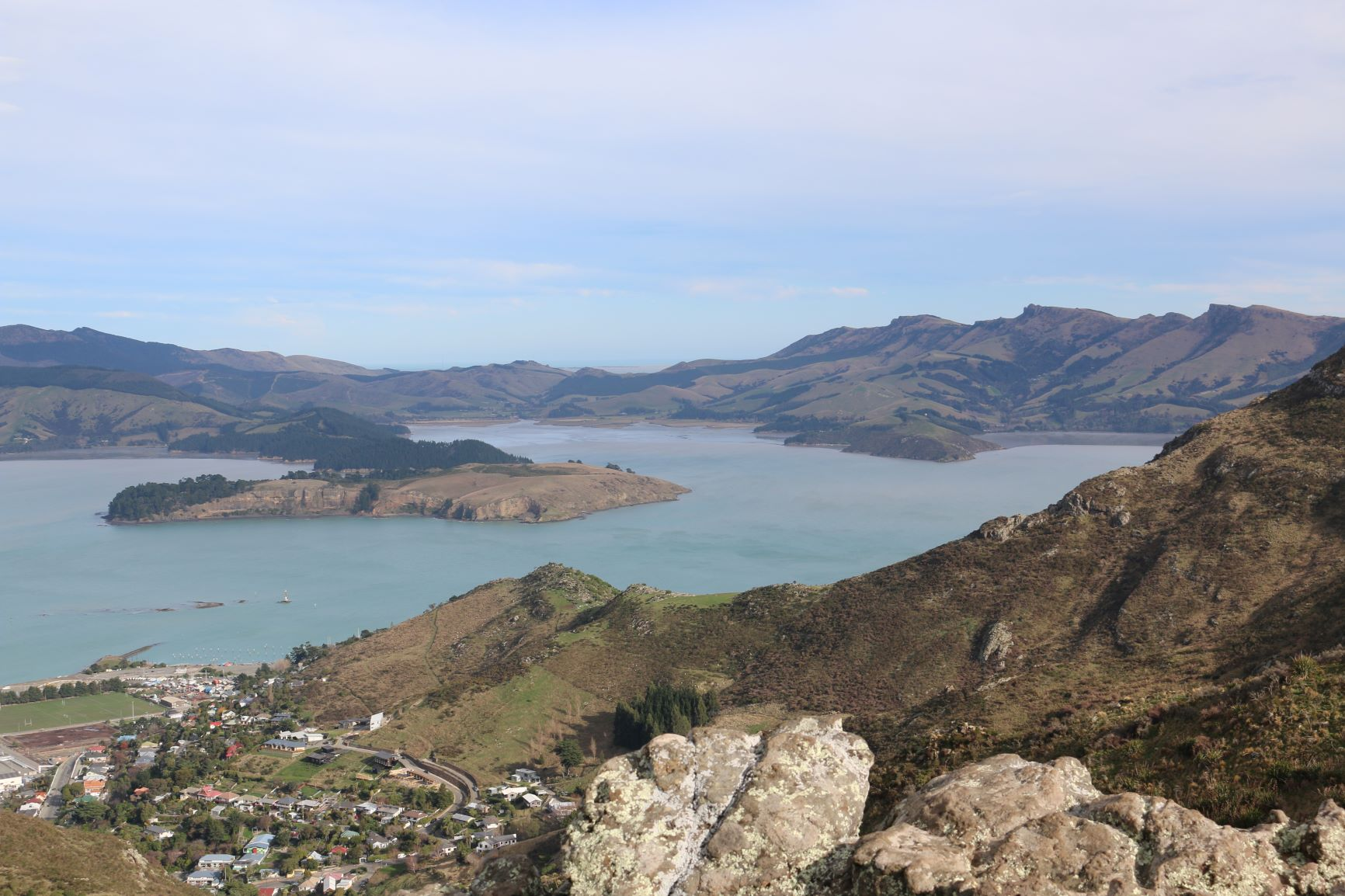
Lyttelton Harbour / Whakaraupō and Ōtamahua / Quail Island (2016)

===== Port Levy =====
Port Levy is the most north facing of the bays on Banks Peninsula. It has been visited by Europeans since the 1820s and known as Koukourarata in Māori.

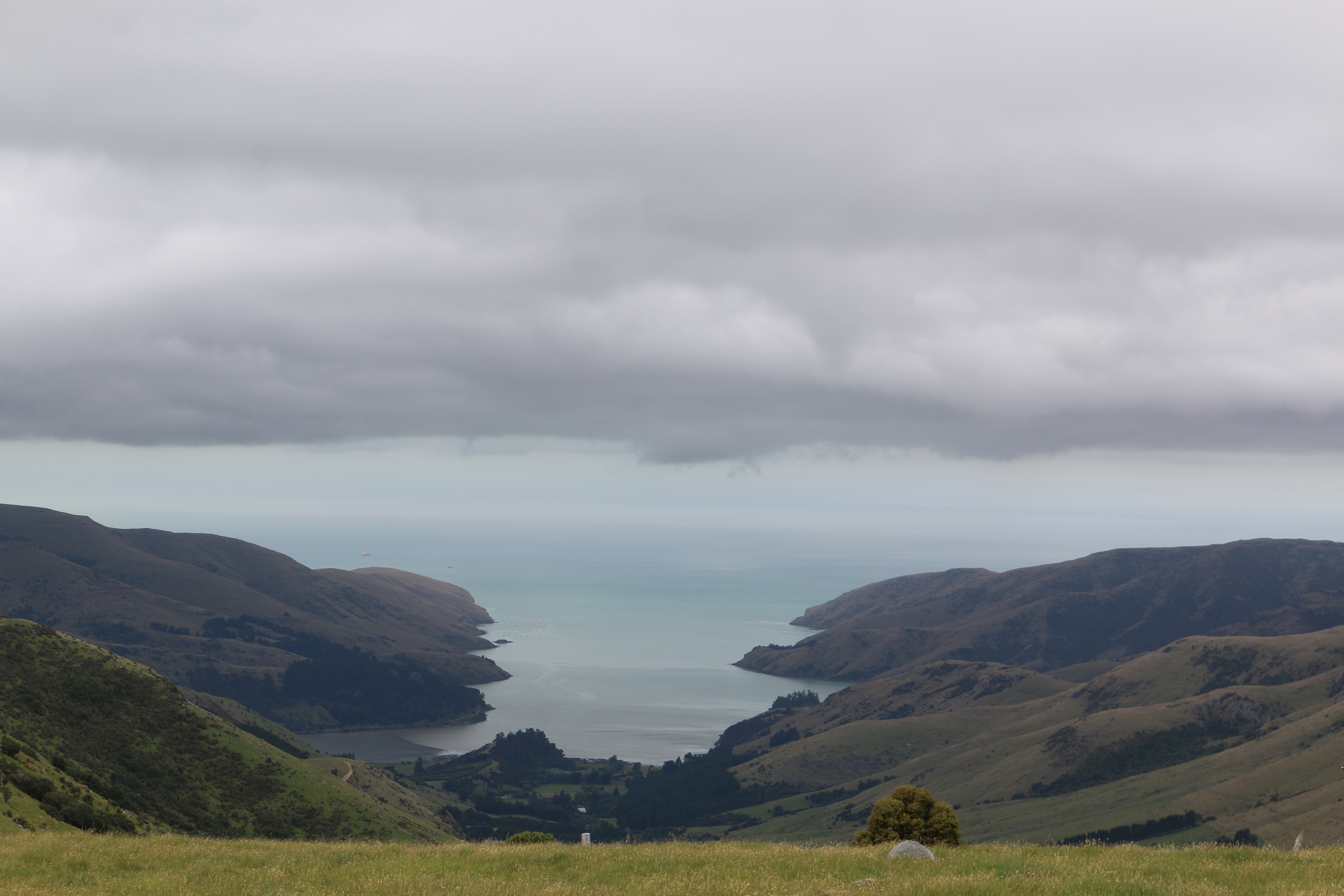
Port Levy (December 2020)

==== Pigeon Bay ====
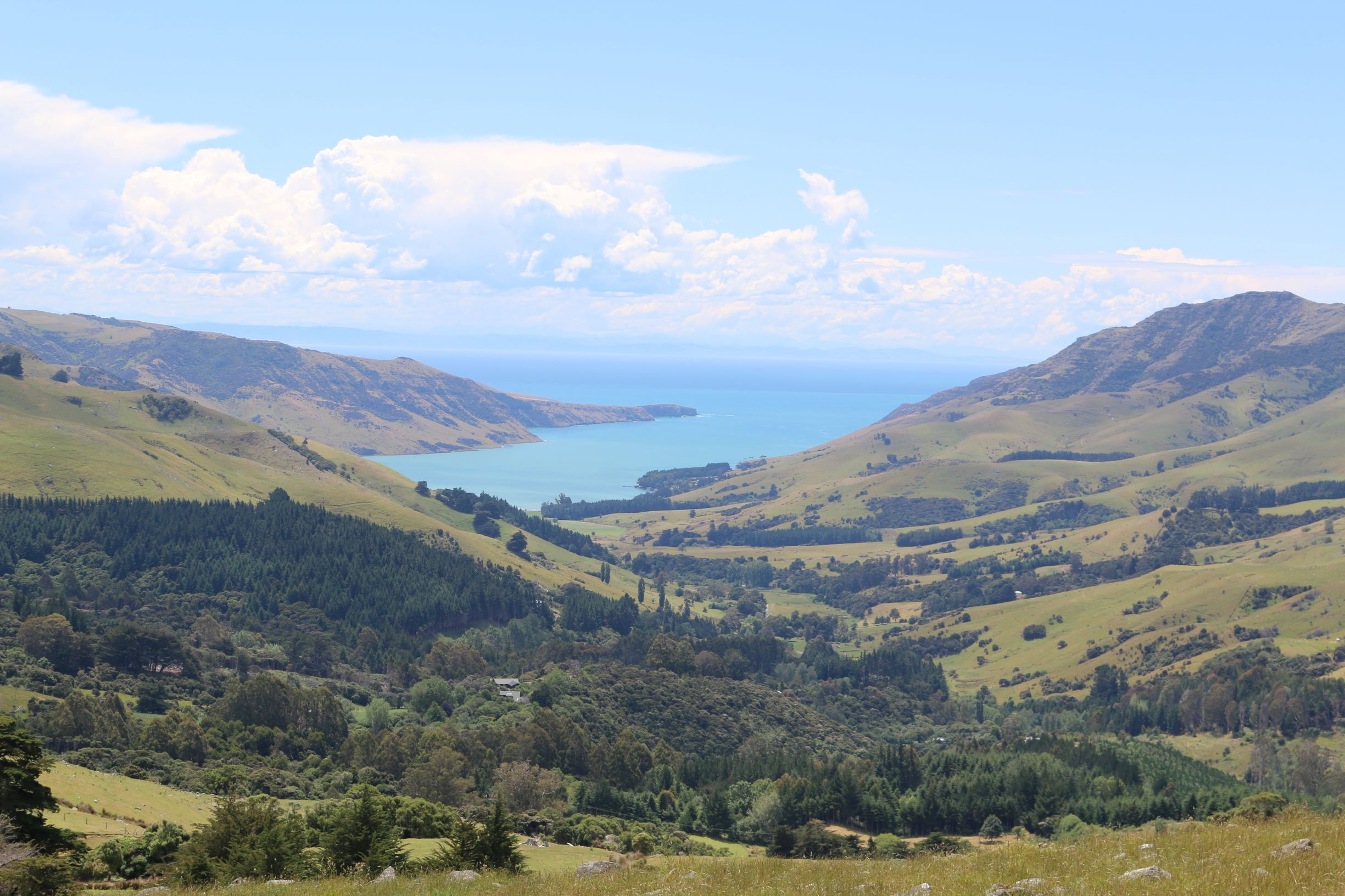
Pigeon Bay (December 2020)

Pigeon Bay has a walking track along the eastern side out to the head of the bay. It takes about 4 or 5 hours to walk there and back. It has spectacular coastal views. There are a number of holiday homes in Pigeon Bay, and a yacht club and camping ground. Pigeon Bay most likely gained its name from early whalers seeing the large number of pigeons (kererū) in the forests there. The first reference to Pigeon Bay was in 1836.

Captain Langlois celebrated his "purchase" of Banks Peninsula on 9 August 1840 by raising the French flag and conducting a 101 gun salute at Pigeon Bay.

HMS Britomart visited Pigeon Bay towards the end of August 1840 conducting the first hydrographic survey and reinforcing British sovereignty of Banks Peninsula.

==== Little Akaloa ====
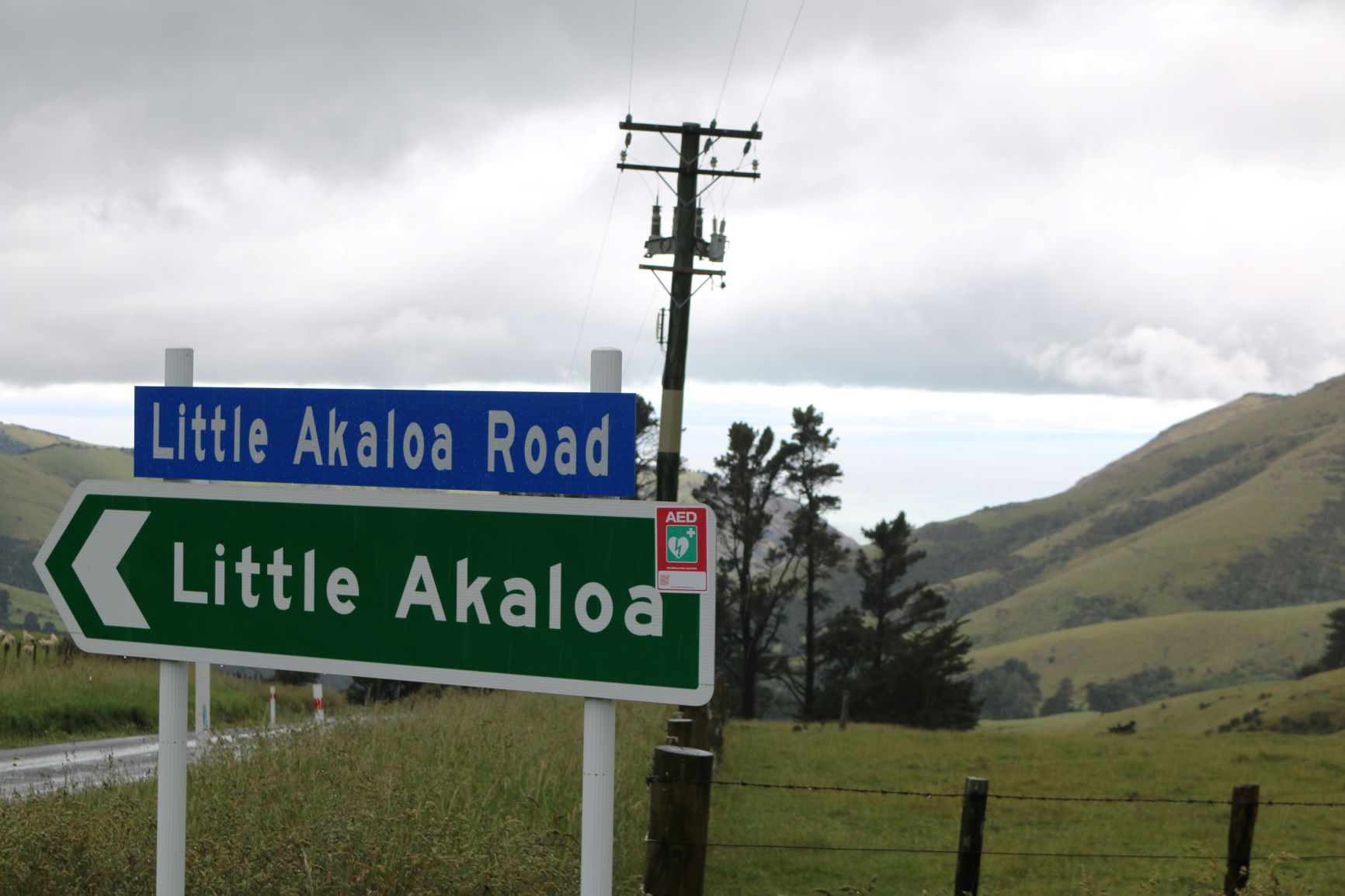
The turnoff to Little Akaloa (December 2020)

Little Akaloa is named "little" to distinguish it from Akaroa. The spelling difference reflecting earlier local Māori pronunciation of 'r' as 'l'. It was spelt Hakaroa until 1864. Feral goats have been a problem in Little Akaloa but a successful cull of them in early 2019 is helping eradication efforts on Banks Peninsula.

A moonfish (150 cm long) washed up on the beach at Little Akaloa in 2013. They are more commonly found further north.

Farming around Little Akaloa is a mainstay of the economy. with accommodation providers being a second. Camping at the Little Akaloa Domain is popular in summer. The beach has a boat ramp.

Little Akaloa is close to the smaller Decanter Bay, and the main access for Decanter is via Little Akaloa.

==== Okains Bay ====
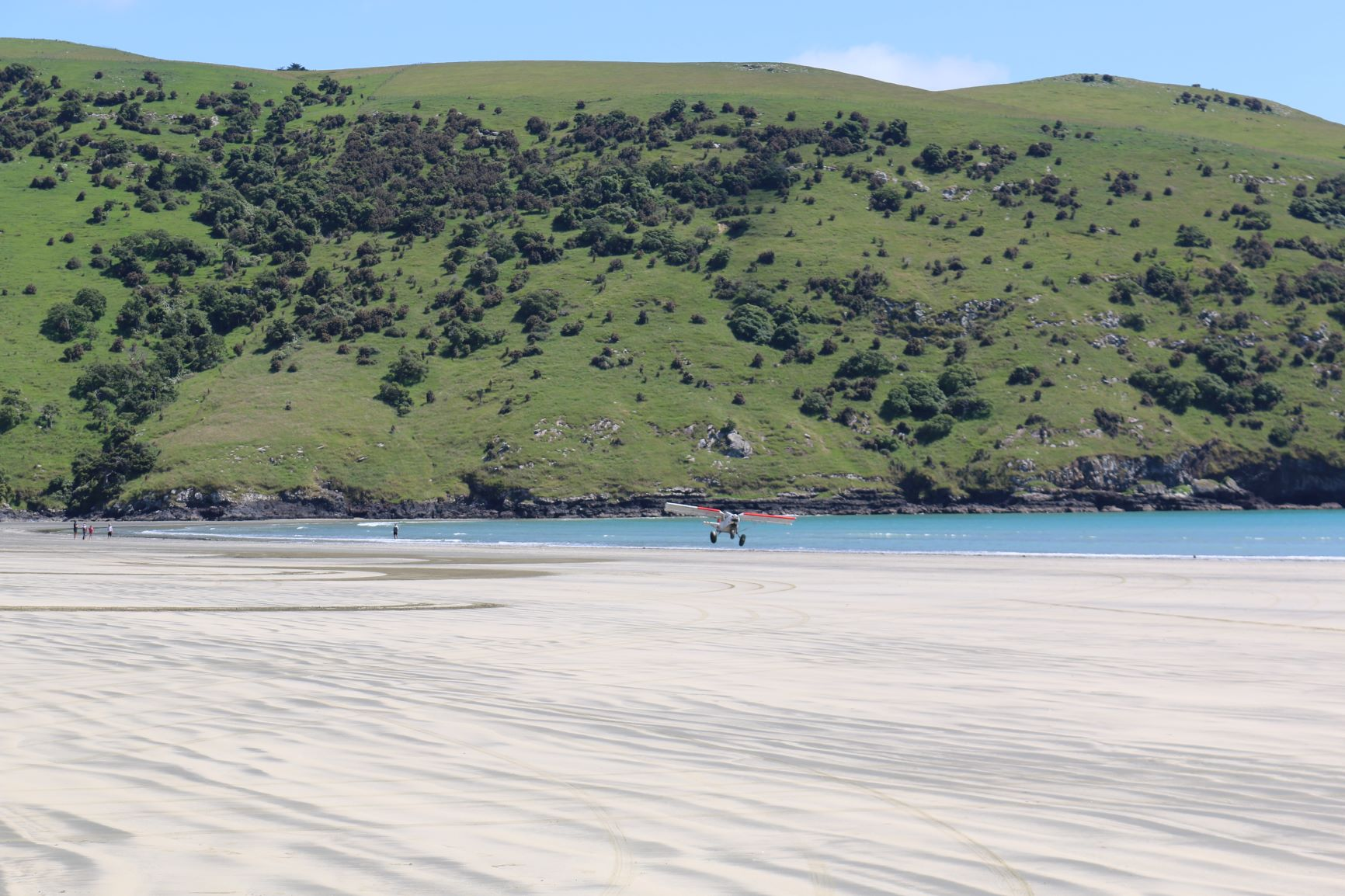
A light aircraft lands on the beach at Okains Bay

Okains Bay has a holiday camp ground and a large sandy beach.

==== Le Bons Bay ====
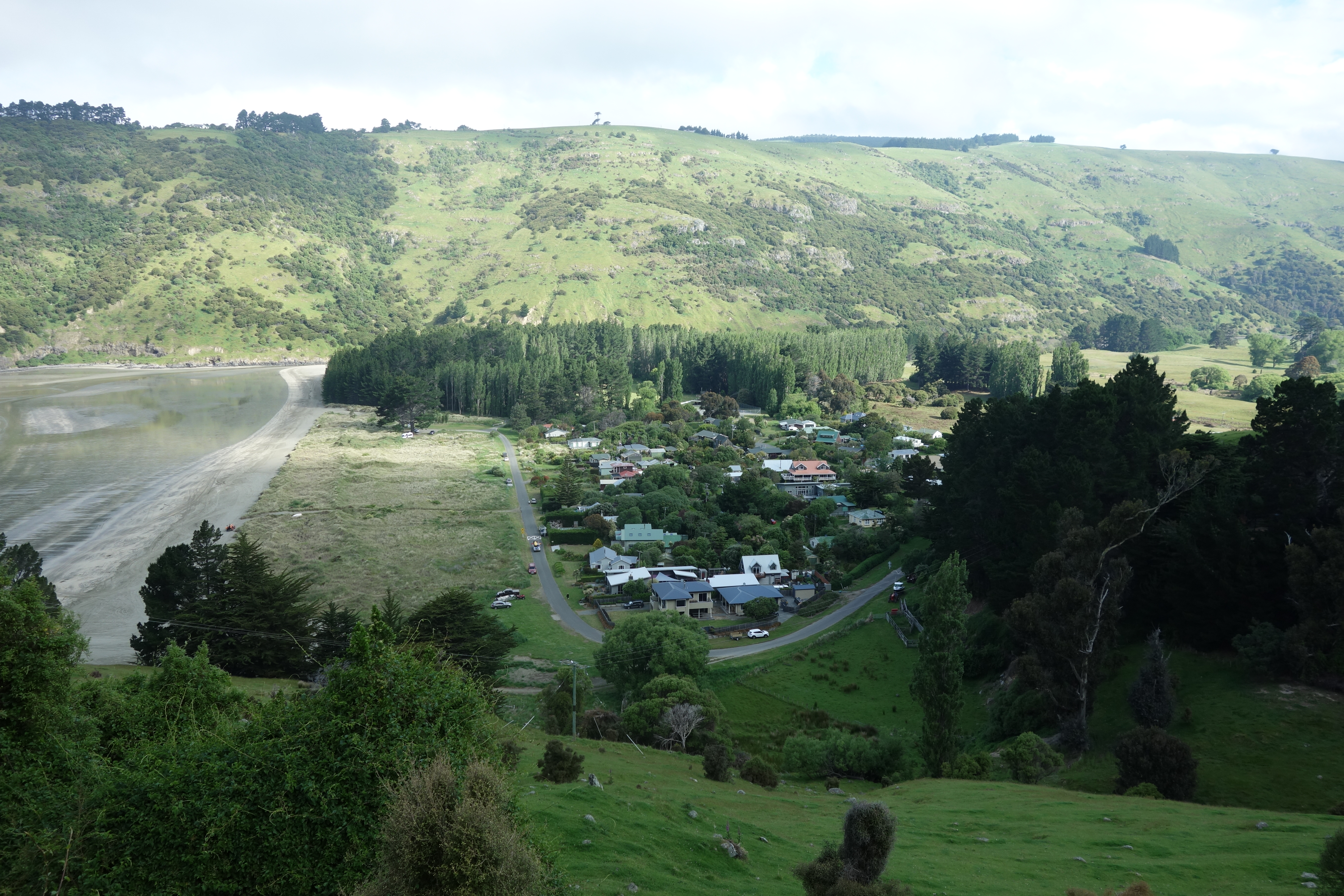
Le Bons Bay (November 2018)

Le Bons Bay has a large often empty beach. There is a small settlement of holiday houses. It is surrounded by rolling hills. A river empties into the sea where New Zealand fur seals often frolic. First known as Bones Bay in 1845, it became known as Le Bons Bay. It is suggested that this was either that a French settler named Le Bon lived there, or that early French settlers called it "The good bay" or that it is a corruption of Bones Bay.

John Cuff and William Cudden established a timber mill in Le Bons Bay in 1857. By 1878, the population of Le Bons Bay reached 237. At this stage, the timber had all been milled and the timber mill was moved to Hickory Bay until 1886.

==== Hickory Bay ====
Hickory Bay is known as having a beach that provides good surfing. It is east facing. It is known in Māori as Waikerikikari, the Bay of Angry Waters, and was never permanently settled by Māori.

The Ellangowan Scenic Reserve walk is located just below the Summit road in Hickory Bay.

==== Goughs Bay ====
Goughs Bay was home to a pā in the 1820s with around 100 people living there. The residents were fugitives from the Kai Huānga feud. In 1830 the pā was attacked by Te Maiharanui and again in 1832 by Te Rauparaha's raiding parties.

Goughs Bay is most likely named after a whaler, Walter Gough, who was put ashore at the bay in 1836 after an attempted mutiny on the whaling barque Australian. He lived there in the Māori community for many years. Goughs Bay was first referenced in 1858 when Elie Bauriaud, who originally arrived on the Comte de Paris, purchased land there.

Goughs Bay is a surfing location with an exposed beach break that provides consistent surf throughout the year.

In 2021, funding was put aside to protect and fence the upper Goughs Bay stream catchment. The aims were to exclude stock, allow native bush to regenerate and improve the water quality. Mataī and tōtara trees will be protected as well as a range of native animals.

A significant rain storm in December 2021 caused damage to the access road to Goughs Bay, with a number of slips making the road impassable. Five weeks later, the road was still closed because of the 34 slips blocking the access road. A report into the Christchurch City Council response to the damage caused by the storm highlighted areas for improvement in how the Christchurch City Council responds to emergencies.

==== Ōtanerito Bay ====
Home to a Ngāti Māmoe pā (known as Parakākāriki) and an ancient Māori burial ground, Ōtanerito Bay possibly means "the place of Tane, the fertile one". Home to the Hinewai reserve since 1987. Ōtanerito Bay also formed part of the Banks Track until 2017.

==== Flea Bay/Pōhatu ====
Pōhatu / Flea Bay has large colonies of penguins and fur seals. It is in the Pōhatu Marine Reserve, which is habitat for many fish species, including triplefins, lumpfish, moki, butterfish, spotties, banded wrasse, blue cod, leather jackets, lobsters, pāua and rockfish.

==== Akaroa Harbour ====
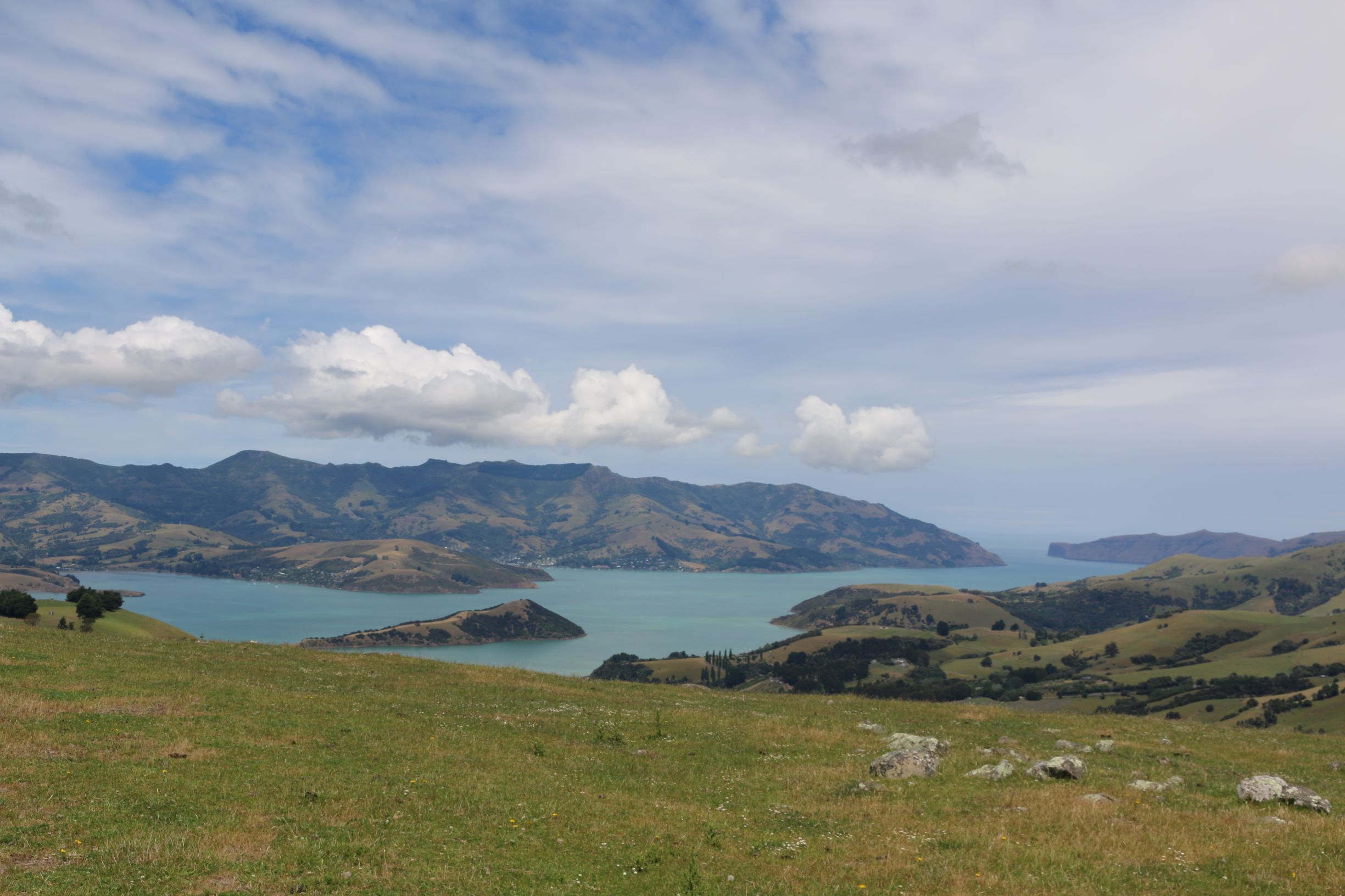
Akaroa Harbour (December 2020)

Akaroa Harbour is one of the two large harbours on Banks Peninsula, the other being Lyttelton Harbour / Whakaraupō.

==== Peraki Bay ====
Peraki Bay is one of the bigger bays on the south west coast of Banks Peninsula. Multiple spellings of Peraki have existed. It was home to a whaling station in the 1830s and 1840s.

==== Tumbledown Bay/Te Kāio ====
Tumbledown Bay is considered one of the best beaches near Christchurch. Most people are put off by the drive to get there, hence it is usually very quiet. Tumbledown bay has supported a large Māori population in pre-European times. Numerous archaeological digs have uncovered artefacts including tool fragments, fish hooks, oven stones and seal, Kurī (dog), tuatara, penguin, kiwi, kererū and moa remains in the middens.

Tumbledown Bay was named as a result of the actions of Billy Simpson, who working on sailing boats in the area as early as 1836. He was instructed to collect a case of alcohol from a local whaling station. On his return, he sat down in the bay and had a drink or two. On getting up he succeeded in allowing all the bottles to tumble down the hillside and break, hence the naming. The earliest reference to the name of Tumbledown bay occurred in 1842.

There are two small islets at the entrance of the bay named Jachin and Boaz (after the pillars to the Temple of Solomon). These were thought to have been named by Bishop George Selwyn.

In 1911, the Bell Flower (a 98 ton schooner) was wrecked on the cliffs next to Tumbledown Bay.

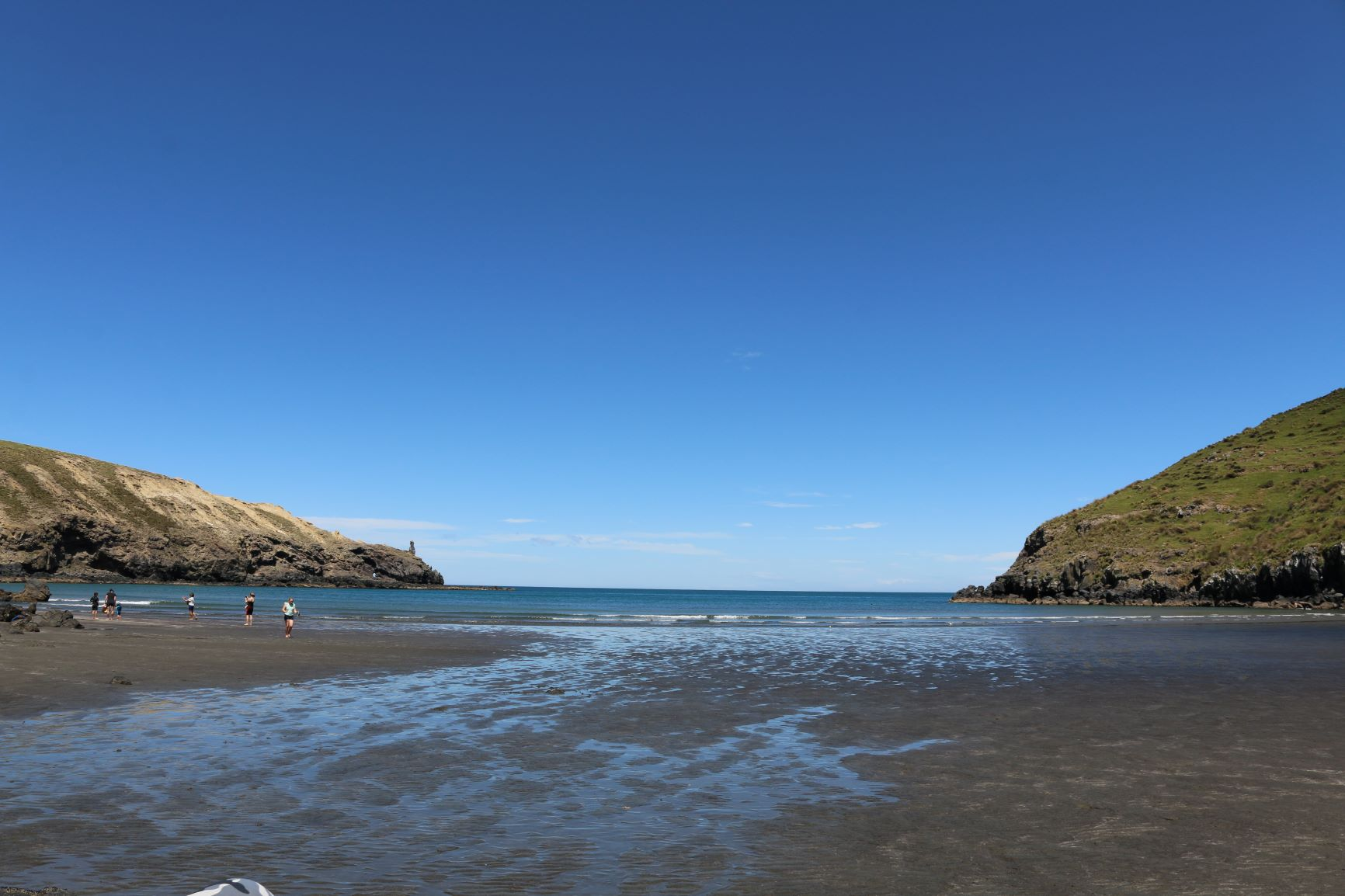
Tumbledown Bay

==== Te Oka Bay ====
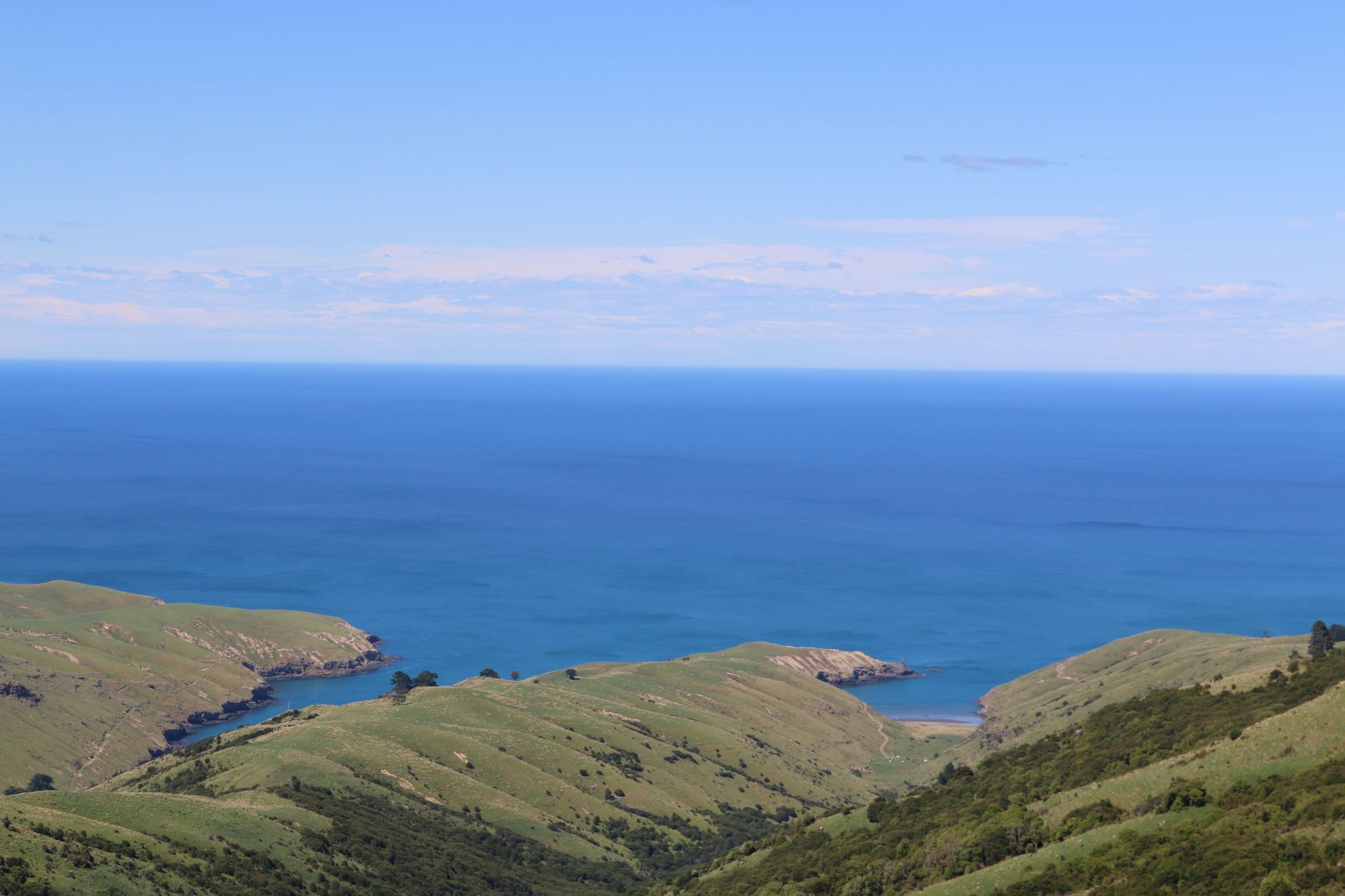
Te Oka Bay (left) and Tumbledown Bay (right)

==== Magnet Bay ====
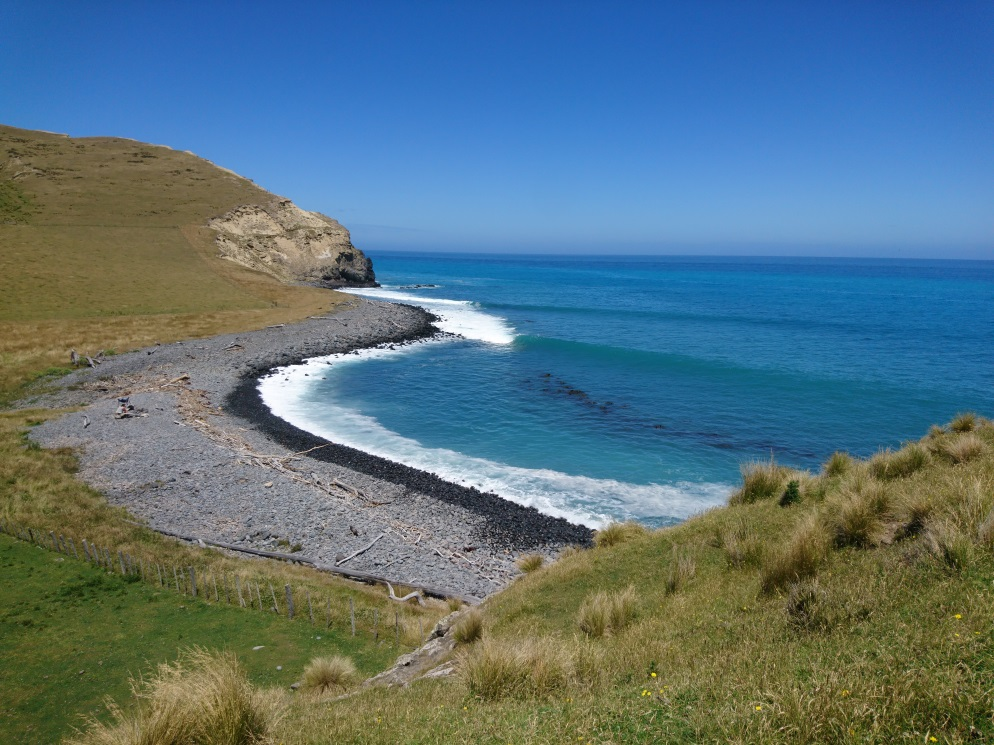
Surf at Magnet Bay

Magnet Bay is known as a spot to go surfing. It has an exposed reef and point break. These provide reasonably consistent surf all year around. The bay is known in Māori as Makara and a pa existed in the bay at one stage. Magnet Bay is named after the Magnet, a 148-ton barque that was shipwrecked in the bay on 3 September 1844. It was sailing under the charge of a Captain Lewis who was travelling from Wellington to Waikouaiti. One person lost their life in the shipwreck.

=== Peaks ===
Banks Peninsula includes many hills and areas of high ground. None of these are classed as mountains according to the New Zealand Alpine Club. Named peaks over 700 metres follow:

Mount Herbert / Te Ahu Pātiki is the tallest point on Banks Peninsula at 919 metres (3,014 ft).

Mt Bradley, the second tallest peak on Banks Peninsula at 855m was named after Reginald Robert Bradley who farmed at Charteris Bay from 1858 and also was the vicar of the Parish of Governors Bay and Purau. His oldest son, Orton Bradley, took over the farm, which became Orton Bradley Park after his death in 1943.

Mt Sinclair at 841m was named after Captain Francis Sinclair who lived at Holmes Bay. He drowned in 1846 when sailing from Banks Peninsula to Wellington in his schooner Jessie Millar. In Māori, Mt Sinclair is known as Tarawera.

Saddle Hill (841m) befits its descriptive name. The French settlers named it Pitou Comete and the Māori named it Puwaitaha or Ka Mokaikai. Near the summit is a spring known as Te Wai-o-hine-puariari

Mt Fitzgerald (826 metres) overlooks Holmes Bay. It is named after William Fitzgerald who arrived at Pigeon Bay in 1861 and taught at the Pigeon Bay Academy until 1869, later becoming rector of Dunedin Training College.

Flag Peak (809 metres)

Stony Bay Peak (806 metres)

Brasenose (785 metres)

View Hill (762 metres)

High Bare Peak (756 metres)

Lavericks (755 metres) and Lavericks Bay could have been named after several people. George Laverick was an early settler in the area. It could also have been named after Captain Laverick of the schooner Lookin, which supplied provisions to Akaroa and the Peninsula in the early 1840s. A third explanation is that it was named after Charlie Laveroux, a Frenchman who ended up marooned at the bay by bad weather during a hunting trip. The Māori name for the peak is Ōtepatotu.

Duvauchelle Peak (738 metres) and the town of Duvauchelle were named after the Duvauchelle brothers who arrived in 1840 at Akaroa. They ran a store in Akaroa before departing for South Pacific Islands in 1843.

Mt Evans (703 metres) was named at some point between 1849 and 1850 after First Lieutenant Frederick Evans of the survey paddleship HMS Acheron.

=== Walking tracks ===
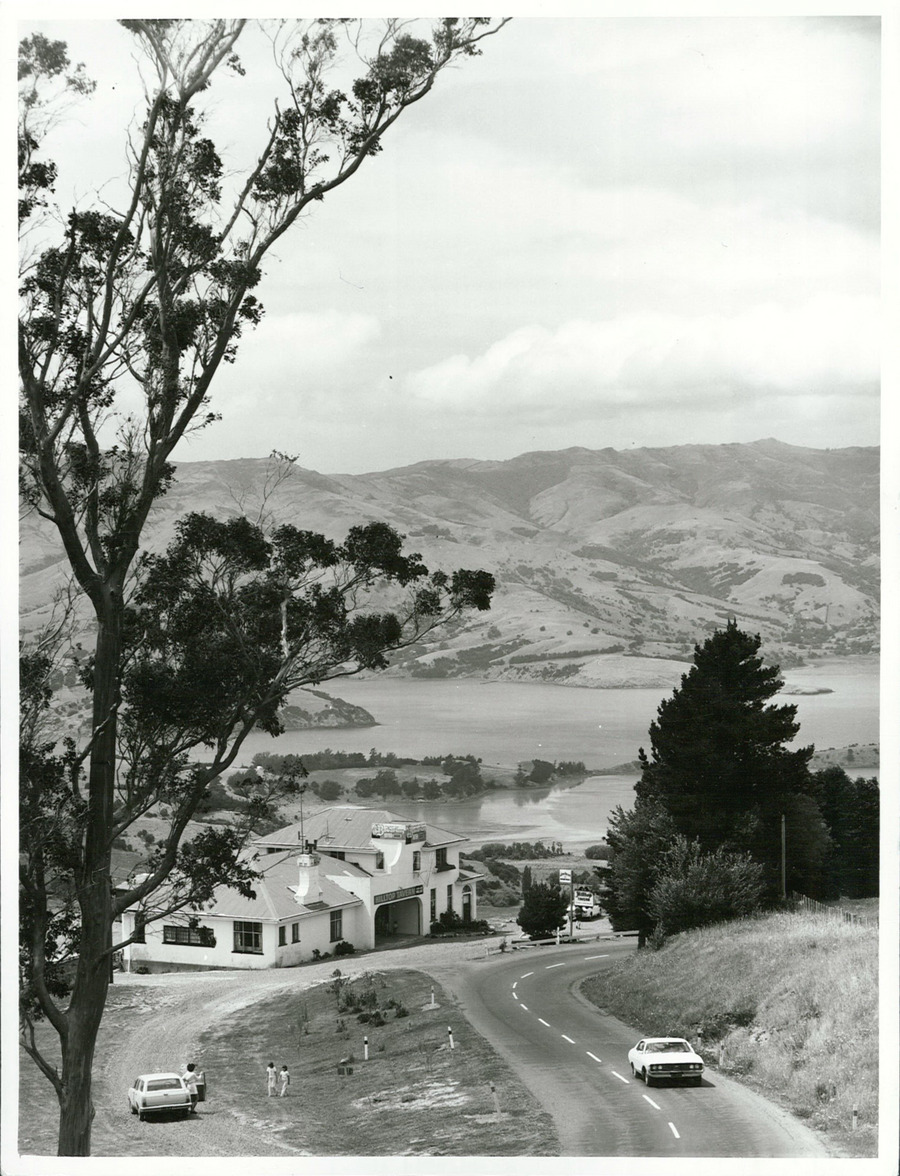
Hilltop Tavern, Banks Peninsula (1973)

==== Banks Track ====
The Banks Track is a 31 km circular route that starts in Akaroa and visits Flea Bay, Stony Bay and Hinewai Reserve.

==== Te Ara Pātaka (Summit walkway) ====
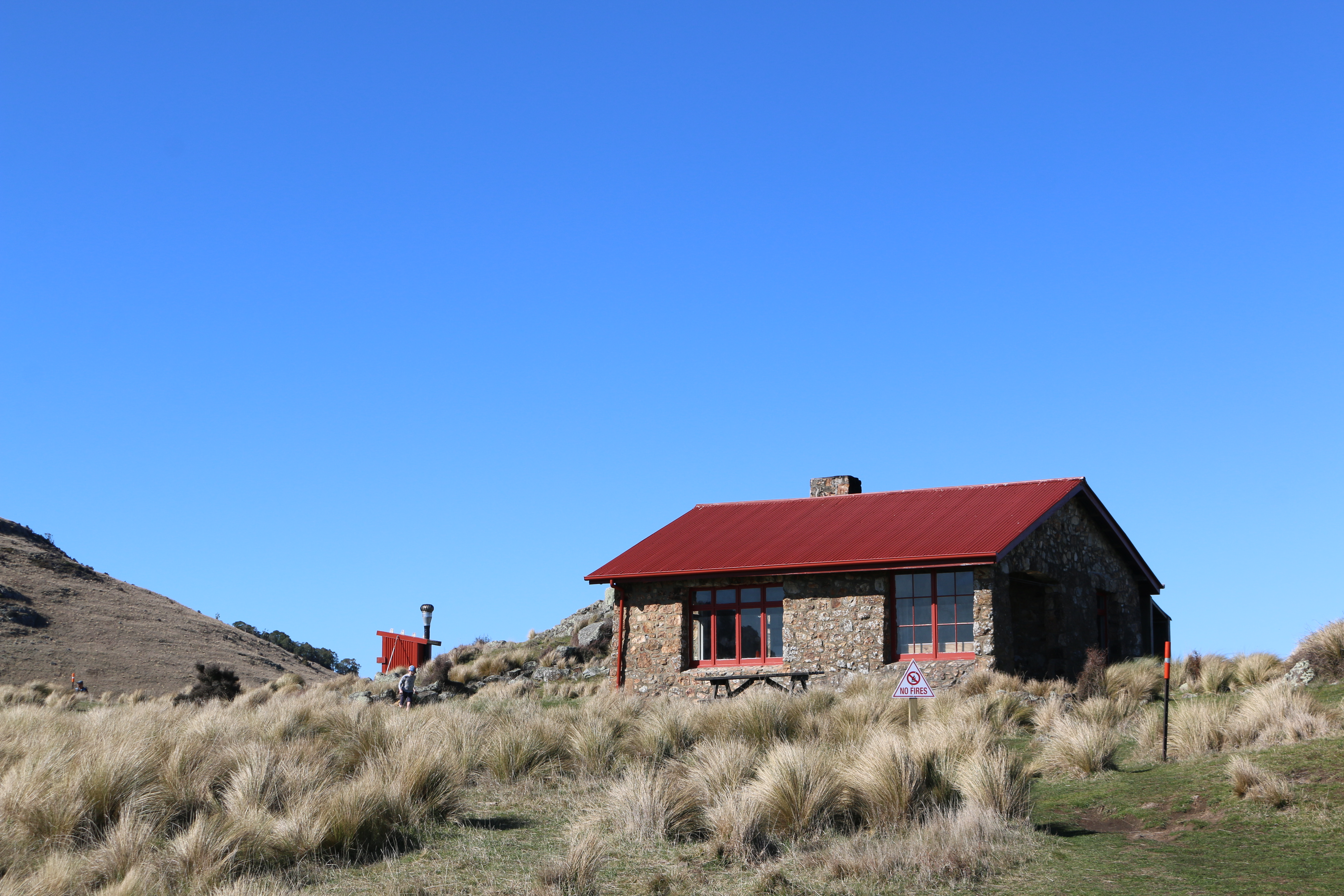
Sign of the Packhorse Hut (2020)

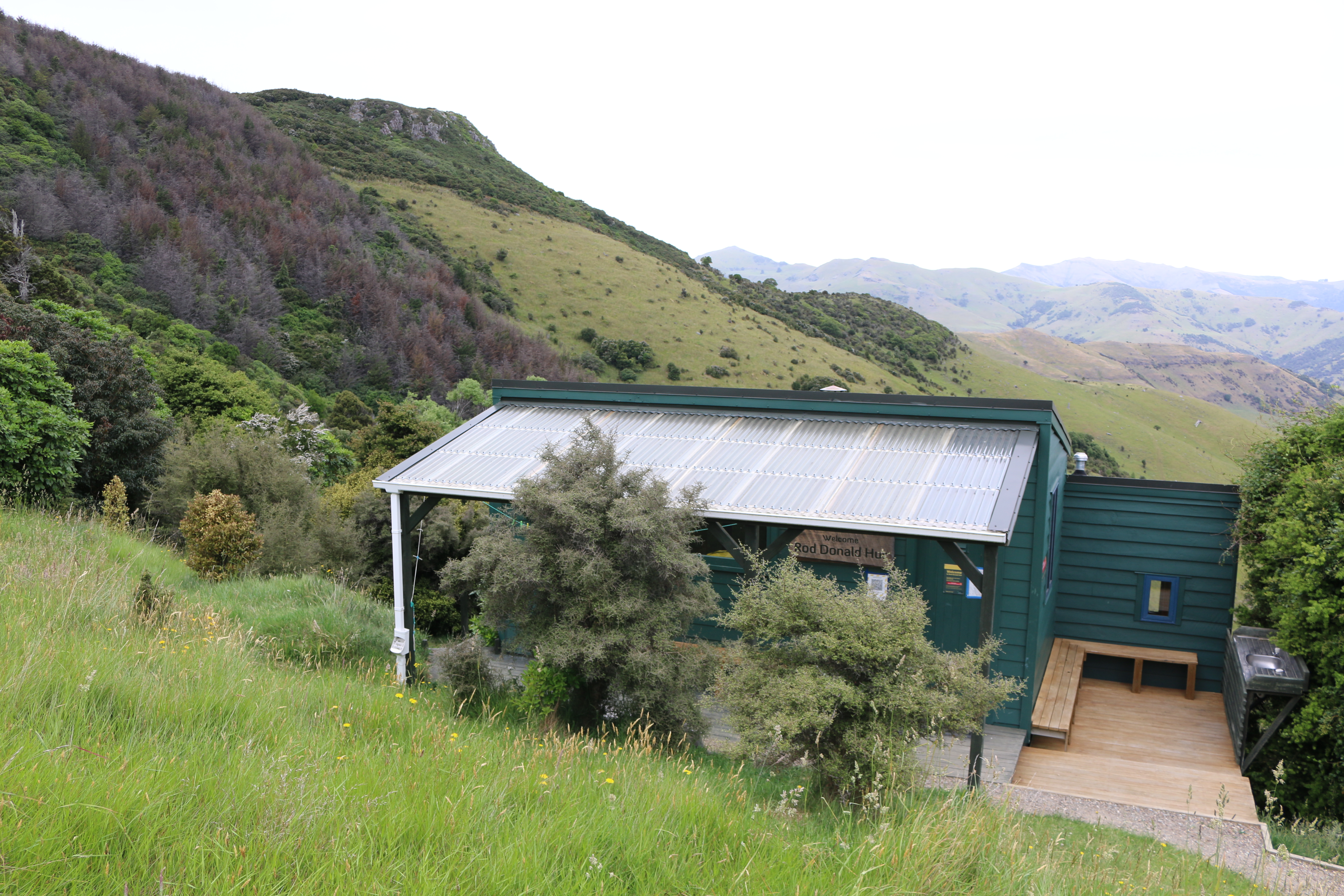
Rod Donald Hut (December 2020)

The Te Ara Pātaka (Summit walkway) is a three day tramp that can start at multiple places. The longest routes start either at Gebbies Pass or Kaituna Valley and go to Sign of the Packhorse Hut on the first day. On the second day, trampers follow a track crossing just below Mount Bradley (855 metres) and then ascend Mount Herbert (919 metres) before descending to the Port Levy Saddle. From here it is a short walk to the second overnight stay at Rod Donald Hut. The third day takes in Mount Fitzgerald (826 metres) and Mount Sinclair (841 metres). The track then descends past a 2000 year old giant tōtara in Montgomery Park Scenic Reserve before finishing near the Hilltop tavern on state highway 75.

==== Summit Road ====
The Summit Road forms a notable feature on the peninsula. The road included portions of the early tracks that were built to move cattle around (e.g. the 15 mile track from Akaroa to Pigeon Bay completed in 1844). Much of the construction was completed in the 1880s with more work carried out in the 1930s, the road is in two sections (both of which have views of the area, as well as parks, walkways, and other recreational features):

- one section runs along the crest of the Port Hills from Awaroa / Godley Head (the northern head of Lyttelton Harbour / Whakaraupō) to Gebbies Pass at the head of the harbour.
- the other section runs around the crater rim of Akaroa Harbour from 'Hill Top' – the junction with the main Christchurch–Akaroa highway – to a point above Akaroa.

== Biodiversity and conservation ==
Estimates suggest that native forest once covered 98% of the peninsula. Māori and European settlers successively removed the forest cover and less than 2% remains today, although some reforestation has started. The sheltered and relatively warm valleys are the southernmost limit of a number of native plant species, including tītoki, nīkau, karaka, kawakawa, akeake and New Zealand passionflower/kōhia. European settlers have planted many English trees, notably walnut.

=== Hinewai Reserve ===
Hinewai Reserve, a private nature reserve, has been established on the peninsula to allow for native forest to regenerate on land that was once farmed. It was established in 1987 and now spans 1250 hectares of native bush. it has 40 km of walking tracks through the native bush.

Other protected areas on the peninsula include Ellangowan Scenic Reserve (3.14 km^{2}), designated in 1973, Mount Herbert Scenic Reserve (2.42 km^{2}), designated in 1980, Wairewa Stewardship Area (6.51 km^{2}), designated in 1987, and Palm Gully Scenic Reserve (1.11 km^{2}), designated in 1989.

=== Marine reserves ===
A large marine mammal sanctuary, mainly restricting set-net fishing, surrounds much of the peninsula. This has the principal aim of conservation of Hector's dolphin, the smallest of all dolphin species. Eco-tourism based around the playful dolphins has now become a significant industry in Akaroa.

The Banks Peninsula Marine Mammal Sanctuary was expanded in 2020, with restrictions introduced on seismic surveying and seabed mining. The sanctuary stretches from the Jed River south to the Waitaki River, and extends 20 nautical miles out to sea, covering an area of about 14,310 km^{2}.

The relatively small Pōhatu Marine Reserve centres on Pōhatu / Flea Bay on the south-east side of the peninsula, and the larger Akaroa Marine Reserve lies at the entrance to Akaroa Harbour. A taiāpure (local fishing co-management tool) is in place for 90 percent of Akaroa Harbour. The history and outcomes of the taiāpure overlap with the two reserves.

=== Rod Donald Banks Peninsula Trust ===
Rod Donald was a member of parliament who died in 2005 aged 47. The Rod Donald Banks Peninsula Trust aims to improve public walking and biking access and enhance biodiversity on Banks Peninsula.

They (in 2020) are raising money to purchase 500ha of land including the summits of Mt Herbert/Te Ahu Pātiki and Mt Bradley with the intention to set up a conservation park protecting and restoring native biodiversity. The land is currently farmland but over time the trust intends to return it to native bush. In May 2021, the money was raised to purchase the land. The Rod Donald Banks Peninsula Trust plans to upgrade fencing and remove feral grazing animals.

The Rod Donald Banks Peninsula Trust are also involved in developing Te Ara Pātaka, also known as the Summit Walkway. They have also been involved in providing tramping huts (Rod Donald Hut and Ōtamahua Hut on Ōtamahua / Quail Island) for the public to access.

=== Banks Peninsula Conservation Trust ===
Banks Peninsula Conservation Trust was formed in 2001. It works to conserve and enhance the biodiversity and encourage sustainable land management on Banks Peninsula. Work being undertaken in 2020 included work to protect ruru (morepork) and tūī. They also work with landowners to legally protect important biodiversity and landscape values in perpetuity through covenants.

== Demographics ==
Historical population
| Year | Pop. | ±% p.a. |
|---|---|---|
| 2006 | 8,166 | — |
| 2013 | 8,235 | +0.12% |
| 2018 | 8,850 | +1.45% |
| 2023 | 9,195 | +0.77% |

Banks Peninsula Ward of Christchurch City Council, which encompasses the area south of the Port Hills, covers 973.22 km^{2} (375.76 sq mi). It had an estimated population of 9,272 as of June 2025, with a population density of 9.5 people per km^{2}.

Banks Peninsula Ward had a population of 9,195 in the 2023 New Zealand census, an increase of 345 people (3.9%) since the 2018 census, and an increase of 960 people (11.7%) since the 2013 census. There were 4,518 males, 4,620 females, and 57 people of other genders in 4,098 dwellings. 4.5% of people identified as LGBTIQ+. The median age was 50.9 years (compared with 38.1 years nationally). There were 1,248 people (13.6%) aged under 15 years, 1,059 (11.5%) aged 15 to 29, 4,737 (51.5%) aged 30 to 64, and 2,151 (23.4%) aged 65 or older.

People could identify as more than one ethnicity. The results were 93.1% European (Pākehā); 9.5% Māori; 1.5% Pasifika; 3.0% Asian; 0.9% Middle Eastern, Latin American and African New Zealanders (MELAA); and 2.4% other, which includes people giving their ethnicity as "New Zealander". English was spoken by 98.4%, Māori by 2.4%, Samoan by 0.2%, and other languages by 11.4%. No language could be spoken by 1.3% (e.g. too young to talk). New Zealand Sign Language was known by 0.6%. The percentage of people born overseas was 26.6, compared with 28.8% nationally.

Religious affiliations were 25.3% Christian, 0.3% Hindu, 0.1% Islam, 0.5% Māori religious beliefs, 0.6% Buddhist, 0.9% New Age, 0.2% Jewish, and 1.6% other religions. People who answered that they had no religion were 63.8%, and 7.0% of people did not answer the census question.

Of those at least 15 years old, 2,844 (35.8%) people had a bachelor's or higher degree, 3,822 (48.1%) had a post-high school certificate or diploma, and 1,278 (16.1%) people exclusively held high school qualifications. The median income was $40,300, compared with $41,500 nationally. 1,134 people (14.3%) earned over $100,000 compared to 12.1% nationally. The employment status of those at least 15 was 3,774 (47.5%) full-time, 1,503 (18.9%) part-time, and 138 (1.7%) unemployed.

== Economy ==
Agriculture has been the main economic activity on Banks Peninsula historically. Mussel farming is carried out at several sites off the coast. Following the major earthquakes of 2010 and 2011, which affected Christchurch and Lyttelton (the harbour serving Christchurch), cruise ships were diverted to Akaroa Harbour.

== Governance ==
The peninsula has two MPs in parliament; one representing the Banks Peninsula general electorate and one representing the Te Tai Tonga Māori electorate. For local government, the peninsula elects one city councillor to the governing body and several members to a community board.

== Le Race ==
The annual 100 km road cycling race from Cathedral Square in Christchurch to Akaroa traverses Banks Peninsula. The course climbs up Dyers Pass road, follows the summit road along the Port Hills before descending Gebbies Pass to State Highway 75. It then ascends to Hilltop before turning off and following the summit road, climbing Duvauchelle peak and descending Long Bays Road into Akaroa. It has been won three times by Mark Bailey and Michael Vink, twice by Jeremy Yates and Daniel Whitehouse. Hayden Roulston (2016) and Brian Fowler (2005 ) have also won it. In the women's competition Jo Buick, Reta Trotman and Sharlotte Lucas have all won it three times.

== Churches ==
There are a number of historic churches in the valleys and bays of Banks Peninsula. These include

- St John the Evangelist Catholic church, Little River
- St John the Evangelist Anglican church, Okains Bay
- St John the Evangelist Anglican church, Duvauchelle
- St Patrick's Catholic Church, Akaroa
- St Peter's Anglican Church, Akaroa
- Trinity Presbyterian Church, Akaroa
- St Kentigern's Anglican Church, Kaituna Valley
- Wainui Presbyterian Community Church
- St Luke's Anglican Church, Little Akaloa
- Knox Presbyterian Church, Pigeon Bay
- St Paul's Anglican Church, Port Levy
- Church of the Epiphany, Anglican church, Gebbies Valley
- St Cuthbert's Anglican Church, Allandale
- St Peter's Anglican Church, Teddington
- St Andrew's Anglican Church, Little River
- Ōnuku Anglican Church, The Kaik, Onuku Road, Akaroa
- St Andrew's Anglican Church, Le Bons Bay
- The Church of the Protection of the Mother of God, Le Bons Bay
