= Little Akaloa =

Little Akaloa Little Akaroa
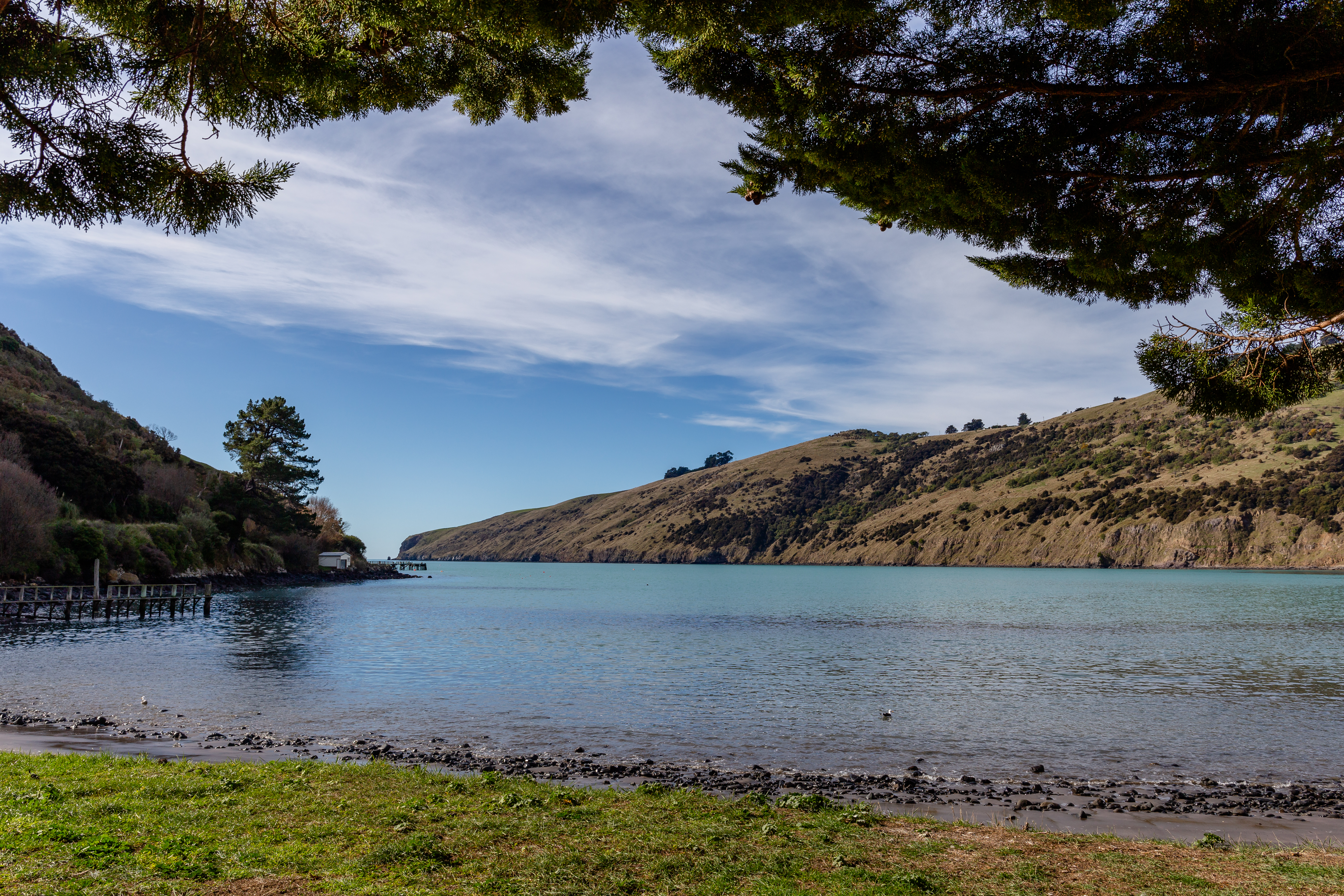
- Little Akaloa Bay

- Location of Little Akaloa on Banks Peninsula
- Coordinates: 43°40′30″S 172°59′30″E
- Country: New Zealand
- Region: Canterbury Region
- District: Christchurch City
- Ward: Banks Peninsula

Area
  - Total: 0.15 km^{2} (0.058 sq mi)

Population (2023 Census)
  - Total: 9
  - Density: 60/km^{2} (160/sq mi)
- Local iwi: Ngāi Tahu

Little Akaloa is a small settlement and bay on Banks Peninsula, in the South Island of New Zealand.

The settlement is sited at the end of the bay, a long, finger-shaped indentation in the northeastern coast of the peninsula, some 35 kilometres (22 mi) southeast of Christchurch and 12 kilometres (7.5 mi) north of the near-namesake town of Akaroa. A small 6-kilometre (3.7 mi) long stream enters the bay at the settlement. Its church, St Luke's, was built in 1905–1906 and registered by the New Zealand Historic Places Trust as a Historic Place Category I in 1993.

The names of both Akaroa and Little Akaloa mean long harbour in the South Island dialects of Māori, which would be spelled Whangaroa in the standard language, cognate with other Polynesian place names like Hanga Roa in Rapa Nui or Fā‘aroa in Tahitian.

== Demographics ==
Historical population
Year	Pop.	±% p.a.
2006	9	—
2013	9	+0.00%
2018	9	+0.00%
2023	9	+0.00%

Little Akaloa covers 0.15 km^{2} (0.058 sq mi). It is part of the larger Eastern Bays-Banks Peninsula statistical area.

Little Akaloa had a population of 9 at the 2023 New Zealand census, which has been unchanged since the 2006 census, but a significant drop from its earlier population. Wise's New Zealand guide reported a population of 63 in 1969.
