= Kaituna Valley Scenic Reserve =

Conservation reserve on Banks Peninsula, New Zealand

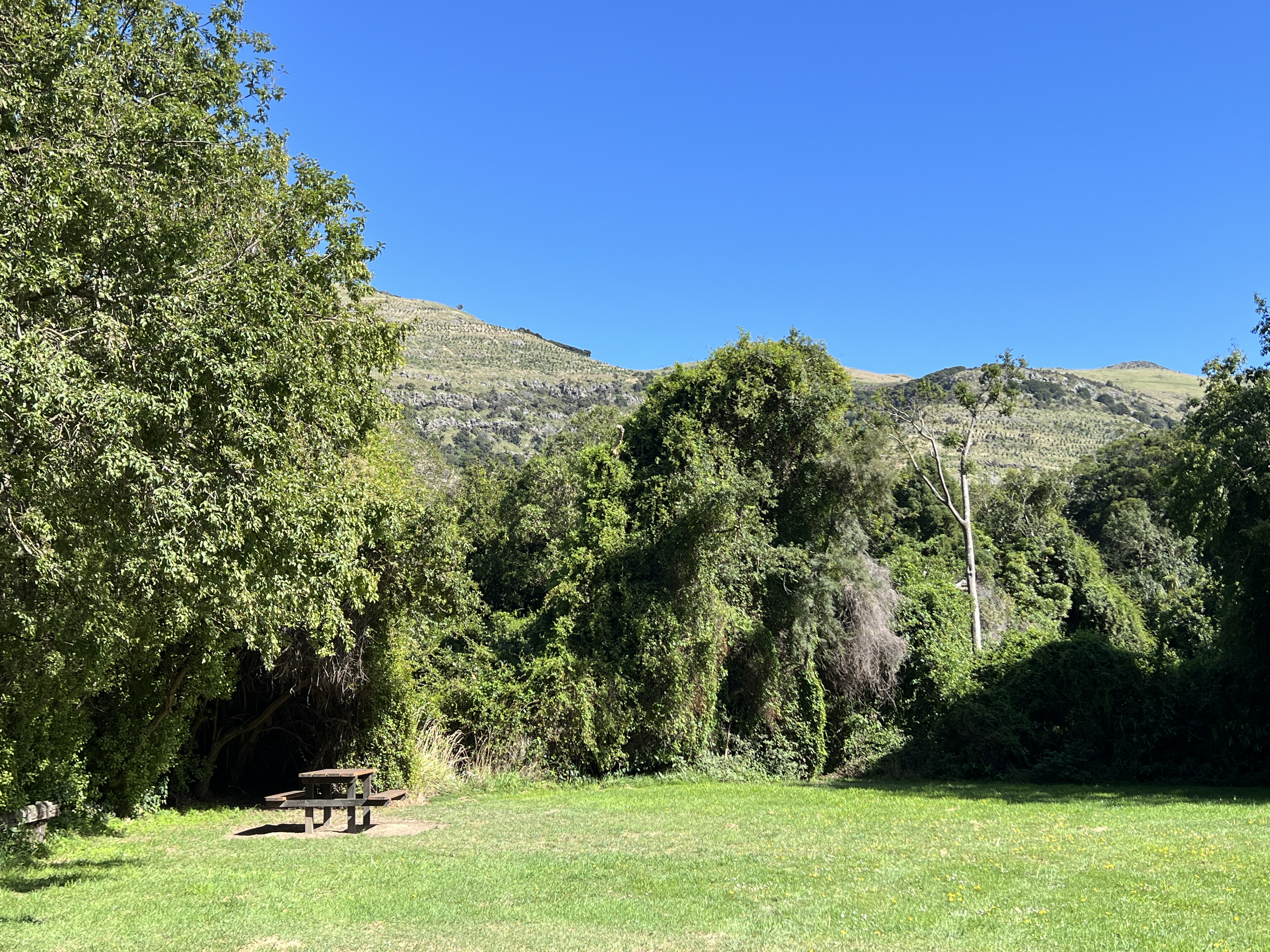
- Picnic area in Kaituna Valley Scenic Reserve

- Location within Banks Peninsula
- Location: Banks Peninsula
- Nearest city: Christchurch
- Coordinates: 43°44′35″S 172°41′17″E
- Area: 6 hectares (15 acres)
- Elevation: 10 m (32.81 ft)
- Created: 1956
- Etymology: Kaituna: "place to eat eels"
- Operator: Department of Conservation (New Zealand)

Kaituna Valley Scenic Reserve is a public conservation reserve on Banks Peninsula south of Christchurch, New Zealand. It sits halfway up Kaituna Valley, and is the only remaining forest on the valley floor.

== Geography ==
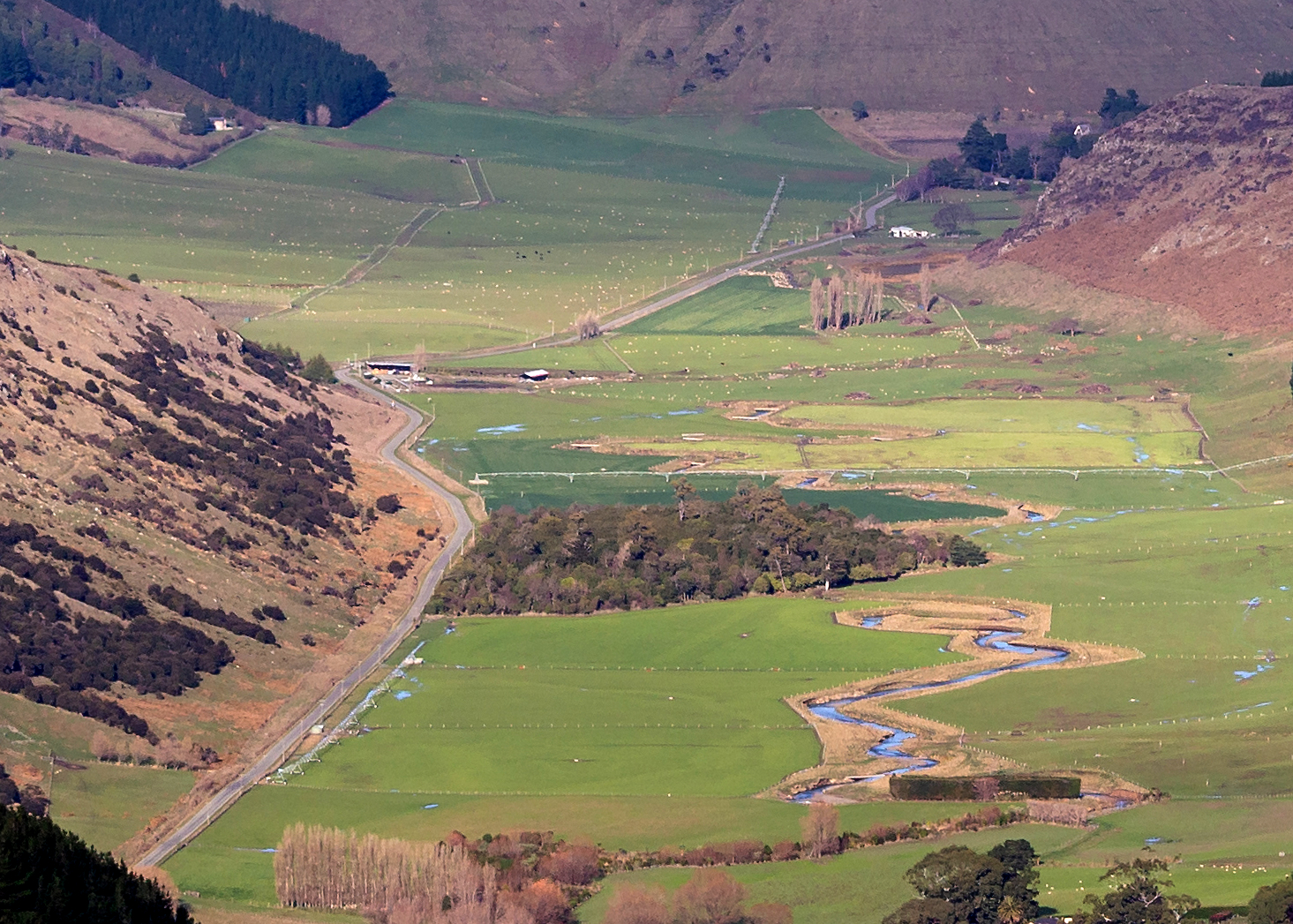
The reserve and Kaituna River viewed from the head of the valley

Kaituna Valley Scenic Reserve is 4.5 kilometres (2.8 mi) up the Kaituna Valley, which is on the south-western edge of Banks Peninsula about 40 kilometres (25 mi) south of Christchurch. The central feature of the valley is the Kaituna River, which flows from the slopes of Mount Herbert through the western edge of the reserve and out to Lake Ellesmere / Te Waihora. The reserve is 6 hectares (15 acres) in size, adjoining the main valley road, with a 1 kilometre (0.62 mi), 10-minute loop track which starts and ends in a picnic area.

== History ==
The Kaituna River and valley was a traditional food-gathering place for Māori, and the river's name translates as "a place to eat eels". After European settlement, the Rhodes brothers (William, George, and Robert) acquired from 1851 to 1862 blocks of land between Lake Ellesmere, Mount Herbert, and Lake Forsyth totalling 25,000 acres (10,000 ha), known as the Kaituna Run. They ran cattle and 25,000 sheep, and the valley contained a flax mill and timber mill. The Rhodes brothers had appointed Thomas Parkinson as their run manager, and when they dissolved their partnership in 1875 he purchased the 12,000 acres (4,900 ha) homestead block in Kaituna Valley.

Although the Peninsula was ravaged by fire in 1862, 1863, and 1880, the extensive harakeke swamps in the valley likely protected this bush block from harm. After Parkinson's death in 1883 the farm was further subdivided, the homestead farm going to his son Walter. Although a sawmill was moved from Little River to Kaituna in 1900 and cut much mataī and tōtara in the upper valley, the Parkinson family saved the bush block from being milled and took only a few tōtara trees, probably for fence posts.

In 1956 the Department of Lands and Survey purchased the bush remnant off the third generation of Parkinsons, fenced it, and designated it Scenic Reserve 4881. On 8 March 1957 the Canterbury branch of the Royal Forest and Bird Protection Society was appointed to manage it, and quickly created a "Scenic Reserves Fund" to maintain it.

== Ecology ==
=== Flora ===
The Kaituna Valley Scenic Reserve is a typical remnant of lowland Banks Peninsula bush. The Kaituna Stream level varies significantly, occasionally flooding the reserve but to dropping to very low levels in summer, and drought has slowed regeneration in parts of the forest. The canopy includes large kahikatea (Dacrycarpus dacrydioides), good-sized mataī (Prumnopitys taxifolia), tōtara (Podocarpus totara), cabbage trees (Cordyline australis), kānuka (Kunzea ericoides), māhoe (Melicytus ramiflorus), lowland ribbonwoods (Plagianthus regius) and especially tītoki (Alectryon excelsus). The abundance of even-aged tītoki in the reserve is its most notable feature, and these make up one of the largest stands of the species surviving in Canterbury. Kawakawa (Piper excelsum), New Zealand passion vine (Passiflora tetrandra) and both species of native jasmine (Parsonsia capsularis and P. heterophylla) are also present. The native stinging nettle ongaonga (Urtica ferox) is common along path edges.

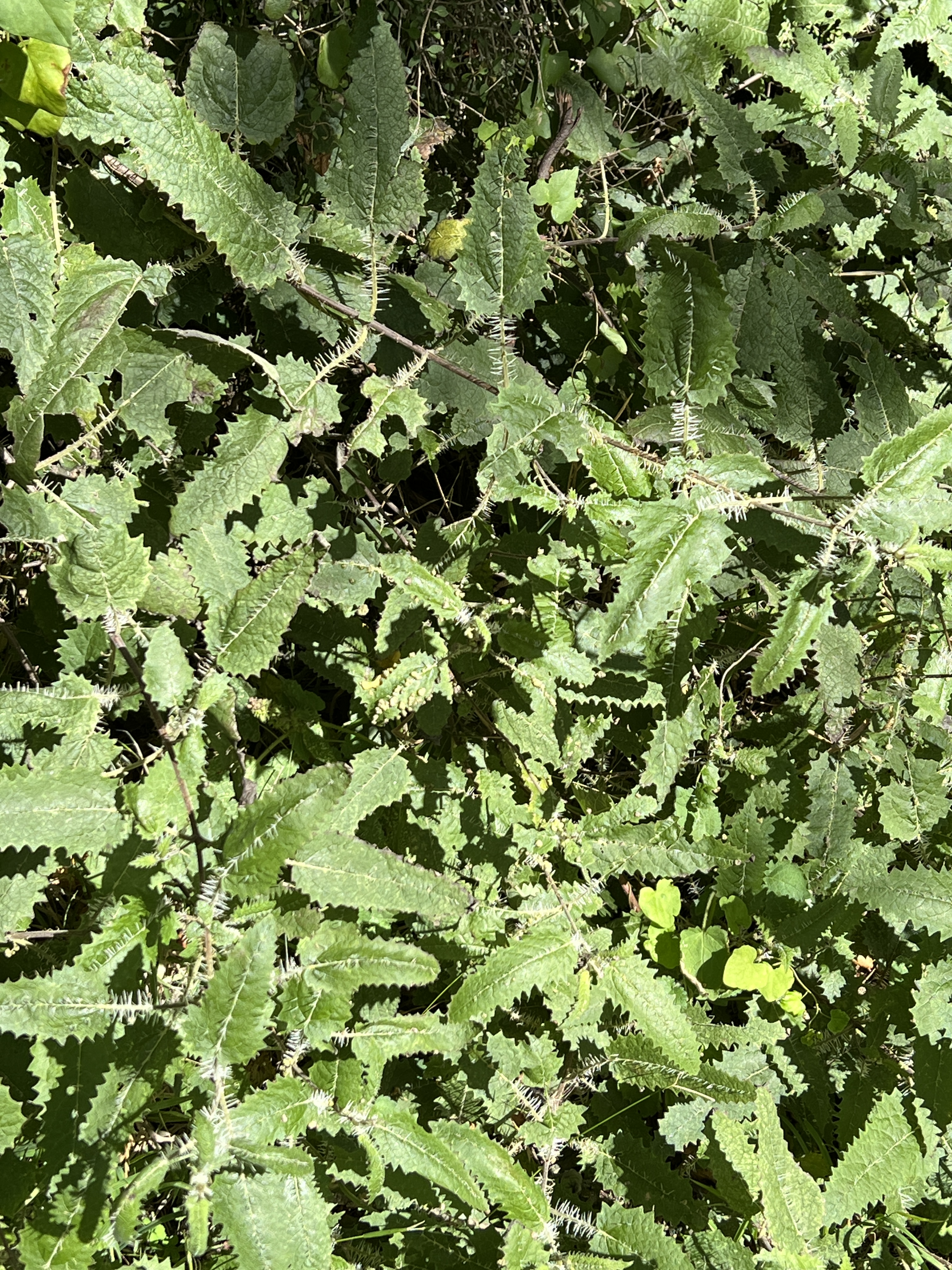
Ongaonga (Urtica ferox)

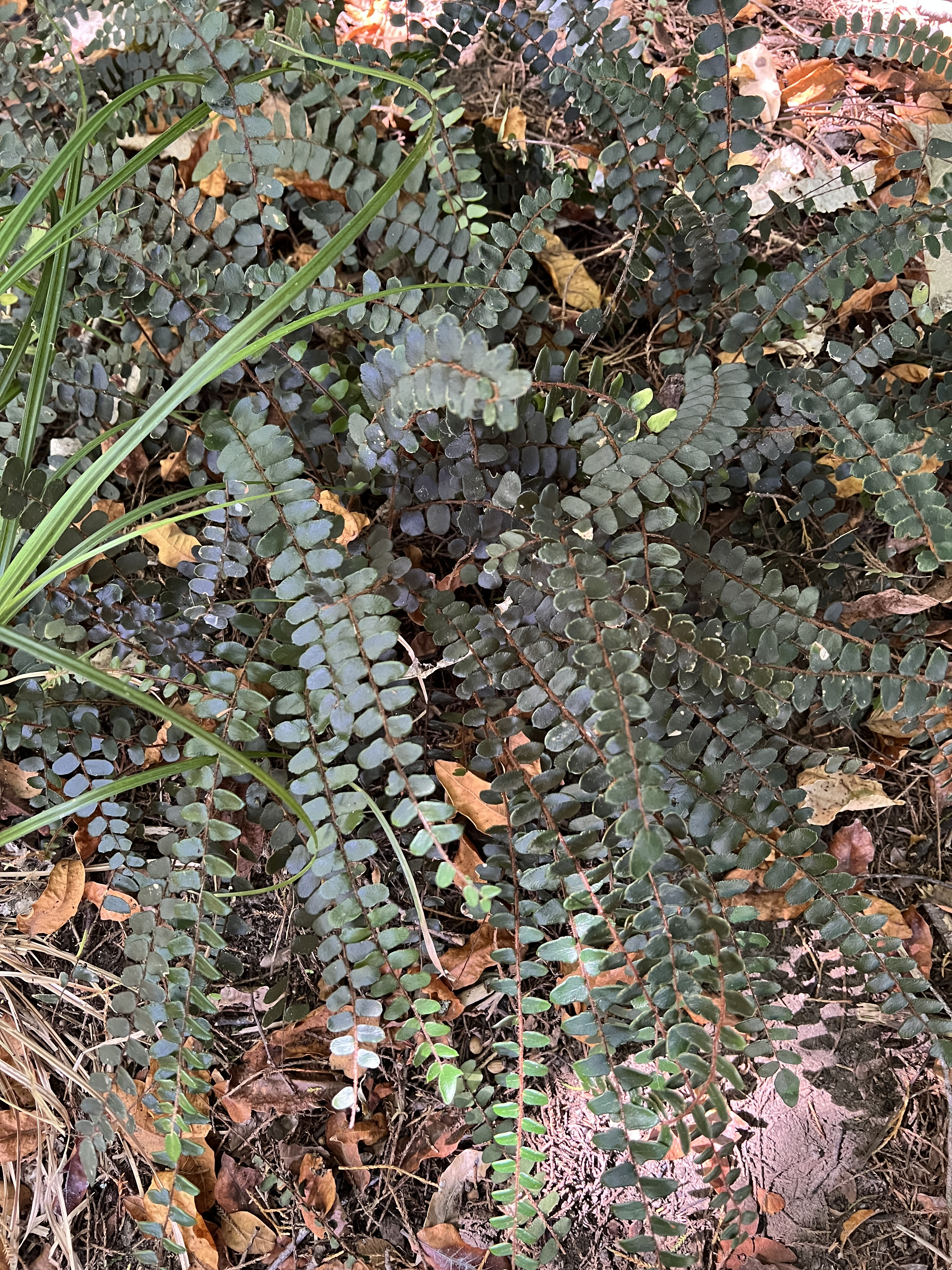
Pellaea rotundifolia

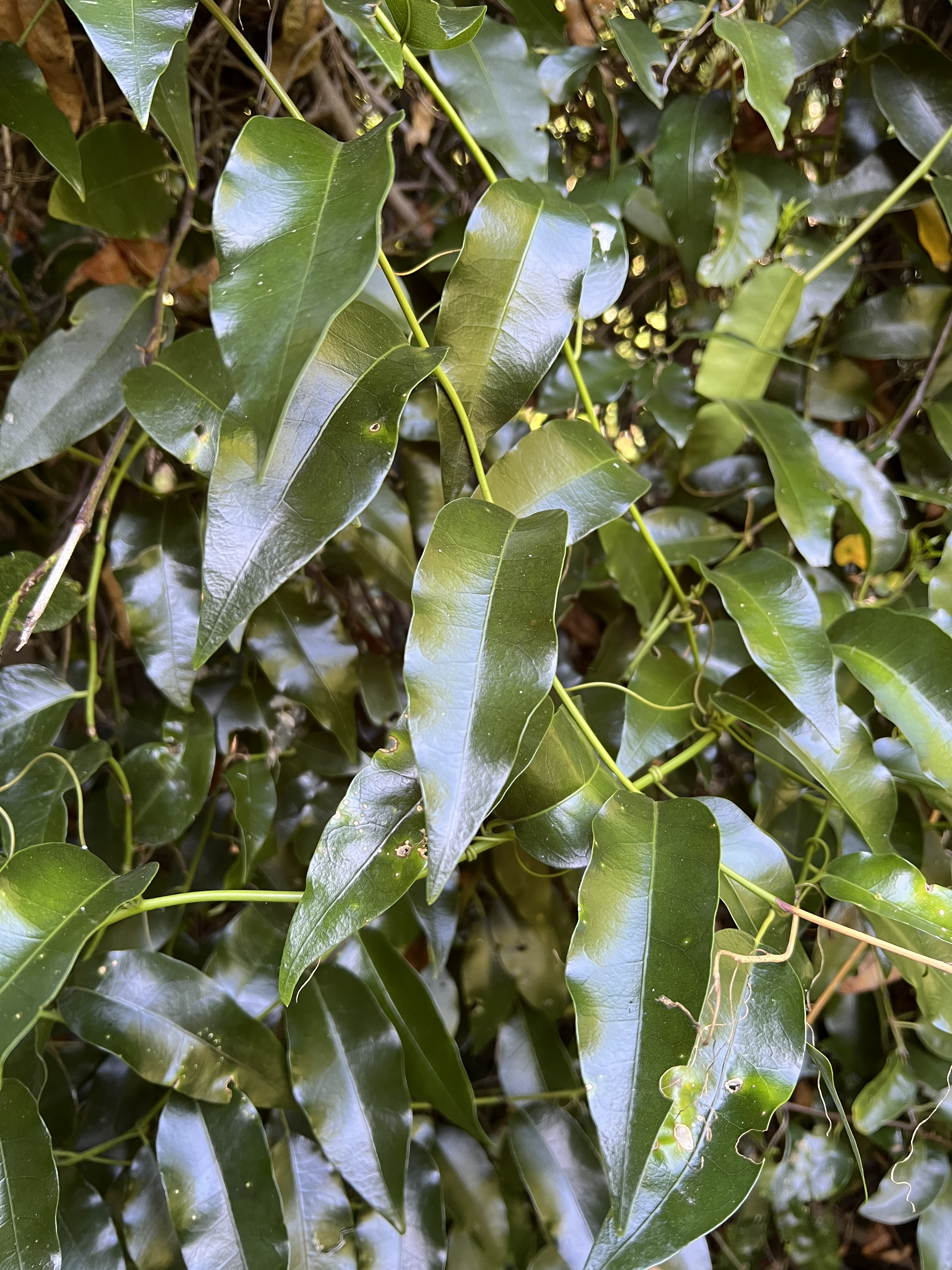
Passiflora tetrandra

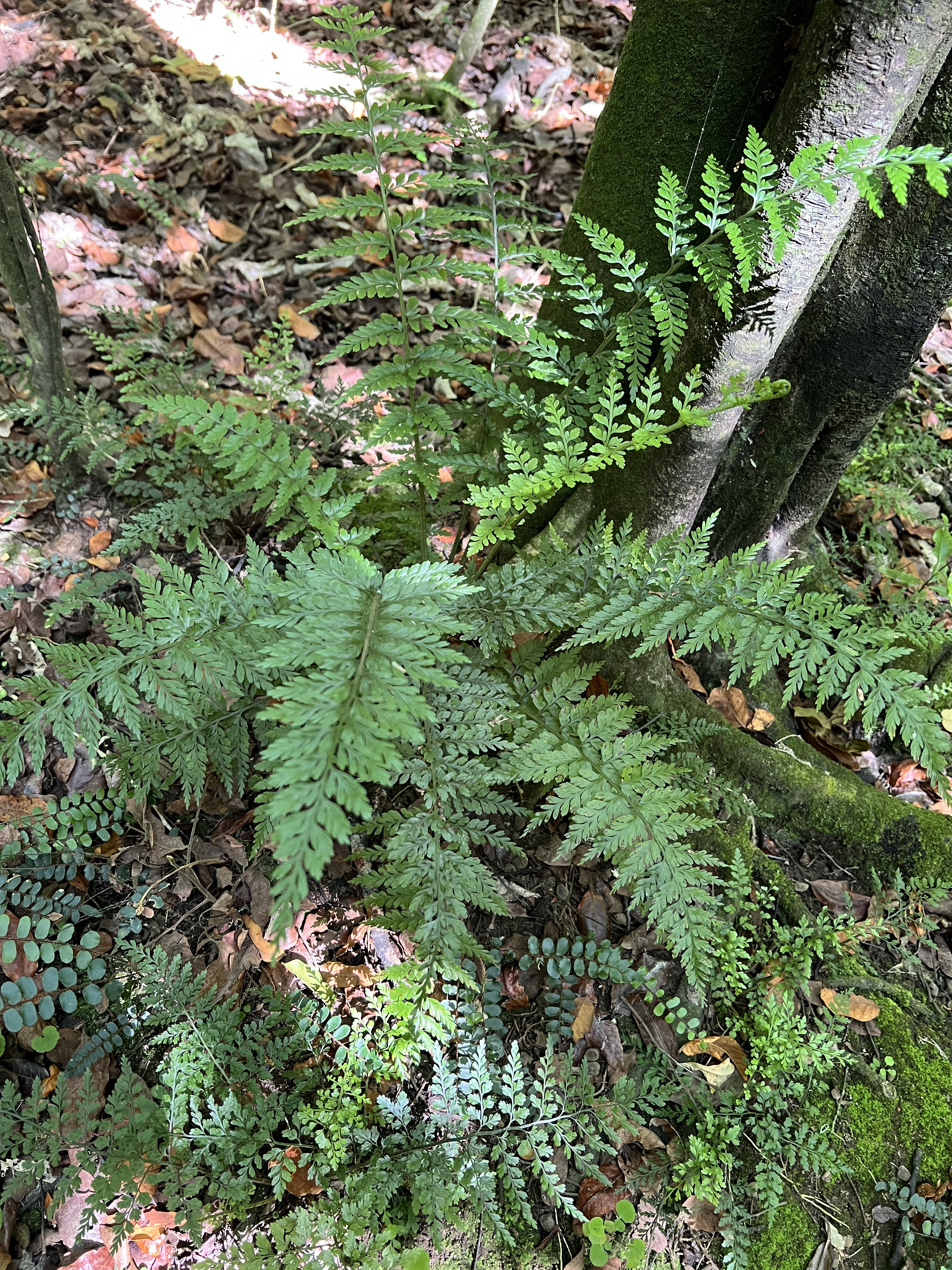
Asplenium gracillimum

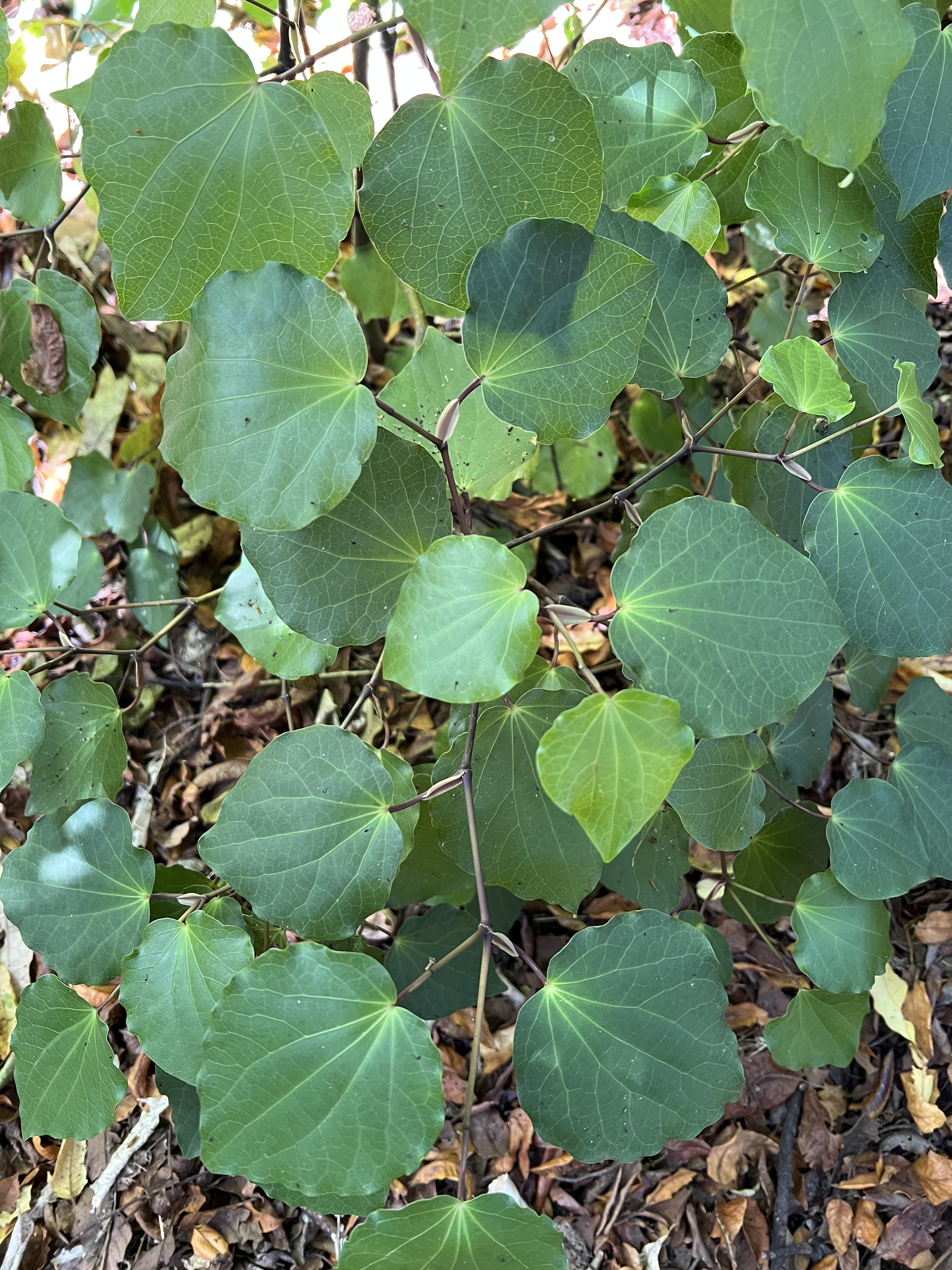
Kawakawa (Piper excelsum)

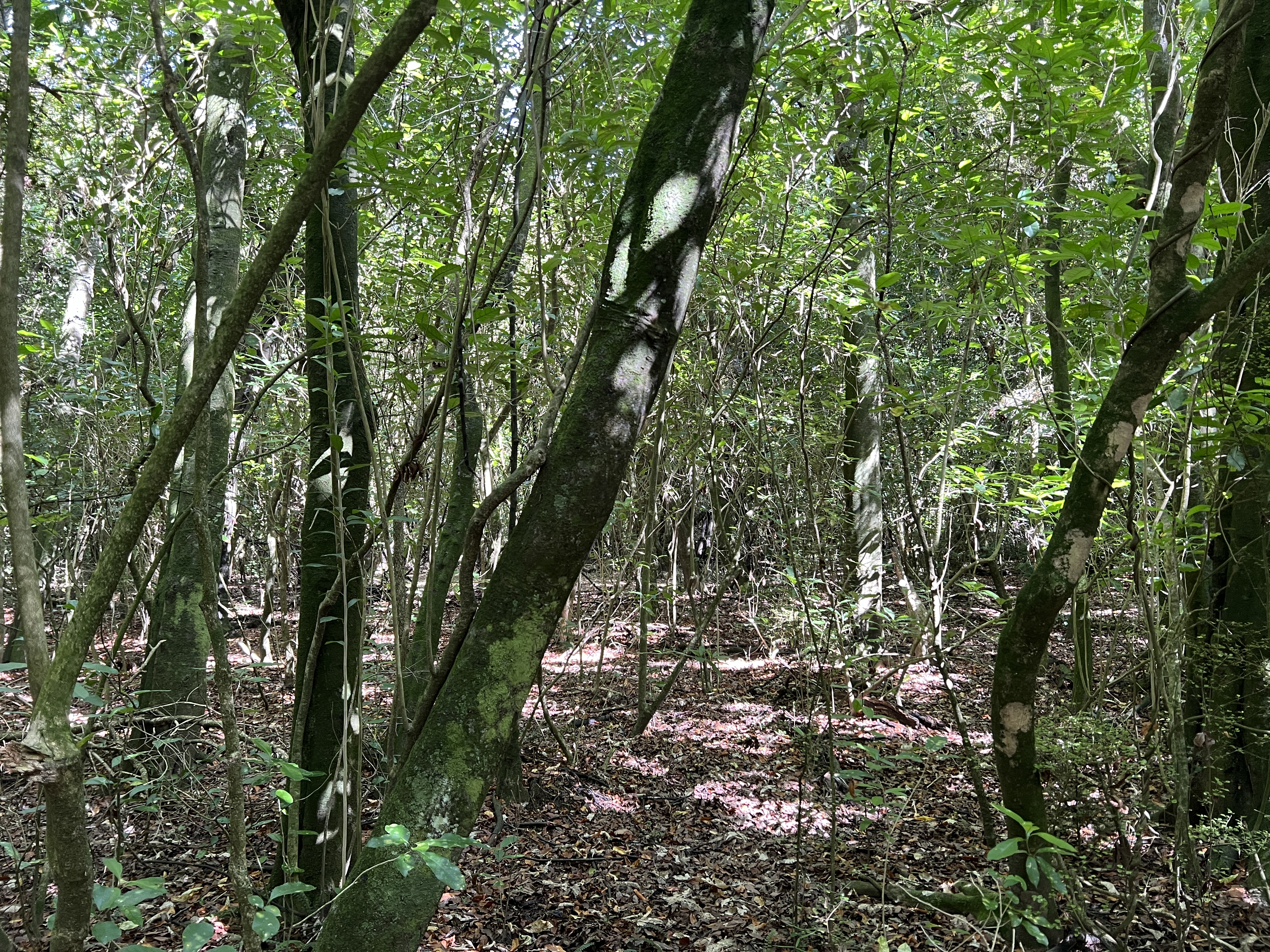
Tītoki (Alectryon excelsus) forest

=== Fauna ===
Native birds present in the reserve include fantails (Rhipidura fuliginosa), kererū (Hemiphaga novaeseelandiae), bellbirds (Anthornis melanura), grey warblers (Gerygone igata), and kingfishers (Todiramphus sanctus). In the 1960s Forest and Bird noted that fantails were likely the only breeding bird species, moreporks (Ninox novaeseelandiae) had not been reported for some years, and the reserve, like other areas on Banks Peninsula, had declining bird numbers. Magpies (Gymnorhina tibicen) were thought to be a factor.

== Management ==
For much of its history, the reserve was unfenced, heavily grazed by cattle, and a source of firewood for local settlers. The Parkinsons planted shelter belts of macrocarpa trees along the southern and western edges, and willows along the north edge, as well as one large walnut tree. The forest was also planted with European flowers such as violets, honesty, and periwinkle. Crack willows (Salix fragilis × S. euxina), elderberry (Sambucus nigra), and hemlock were encroaching and competing with native plants at the time the forest was purchased by the government. Broom, fennel, and old man's beard were common on the reserve edges.

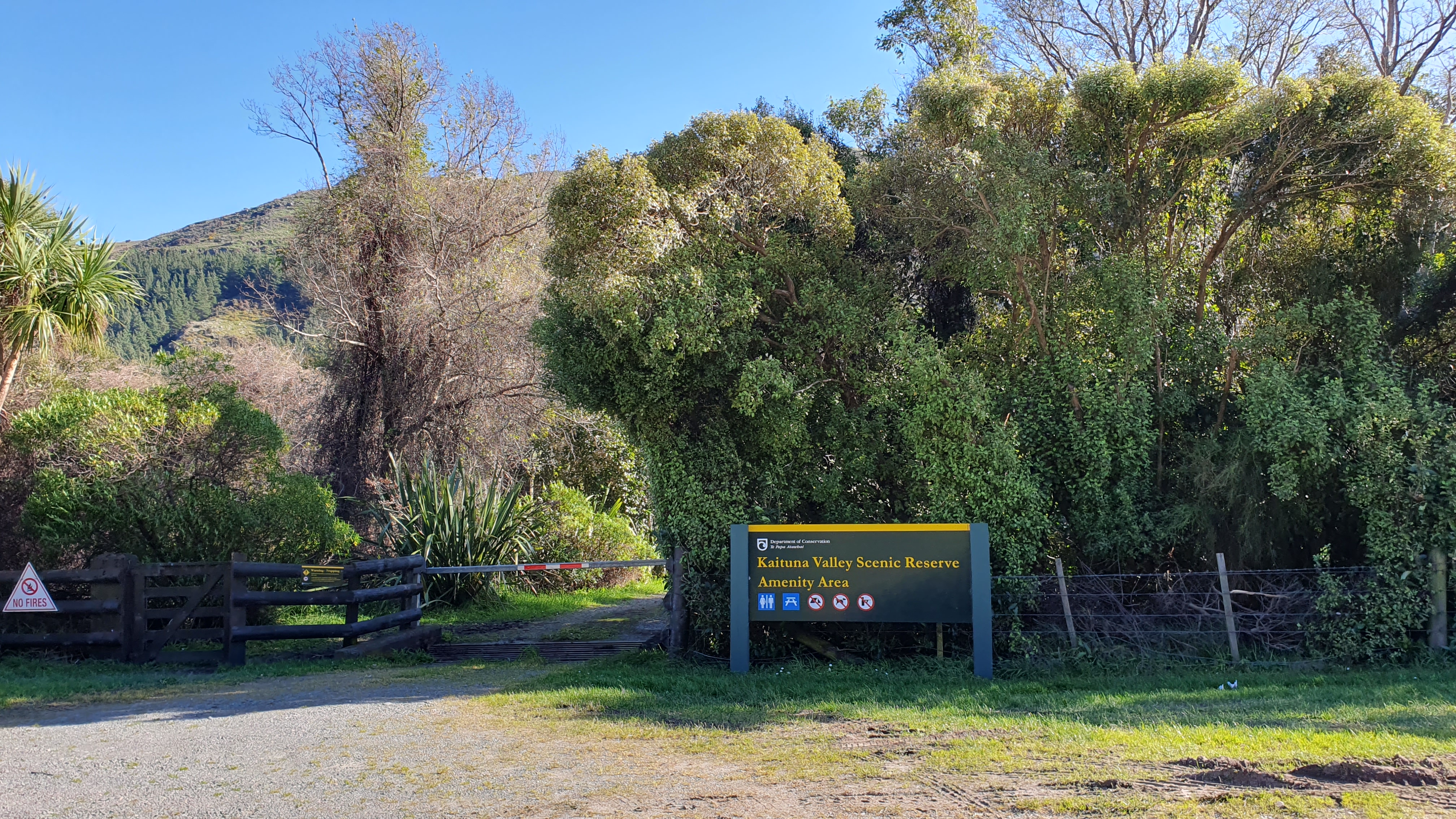
Reserve entrance

When Forest and Bird took over management in 1957, they began removing exotic vegetation, and started planting native trees. They repaired boundary fences that had been destroyed by flooding, and cut a loop track through the forest. The Wairewa County Council created vehicle access and a grassed parking/picnic area, which for years was shaded by giant macrocarpa trees. Floods regularly washed away topsoil and spread weed seeds, and in the early years planted trees had to compete against lush cocksfoot grass. After grazing animals had been fenced out for 10 years, natural regeneration of the forest was evident. Forest and Bird volunteers poisoned the willows along the northern boundary and planted 120 Pittosporum tenuifolium as a shelter belt instead. Planting continued each Arbor Day; in 1968 for example 500 trees, mostly karamū (Coprosma robusta), kōwhai (Sophora microphylla) and cabbage trees (Coryline australis) were planted. These replaced trees lost the Wahine storm in April that year, when the Kaituna River flooded the reserve and toppled large mataī trees as well as macrocarpas.

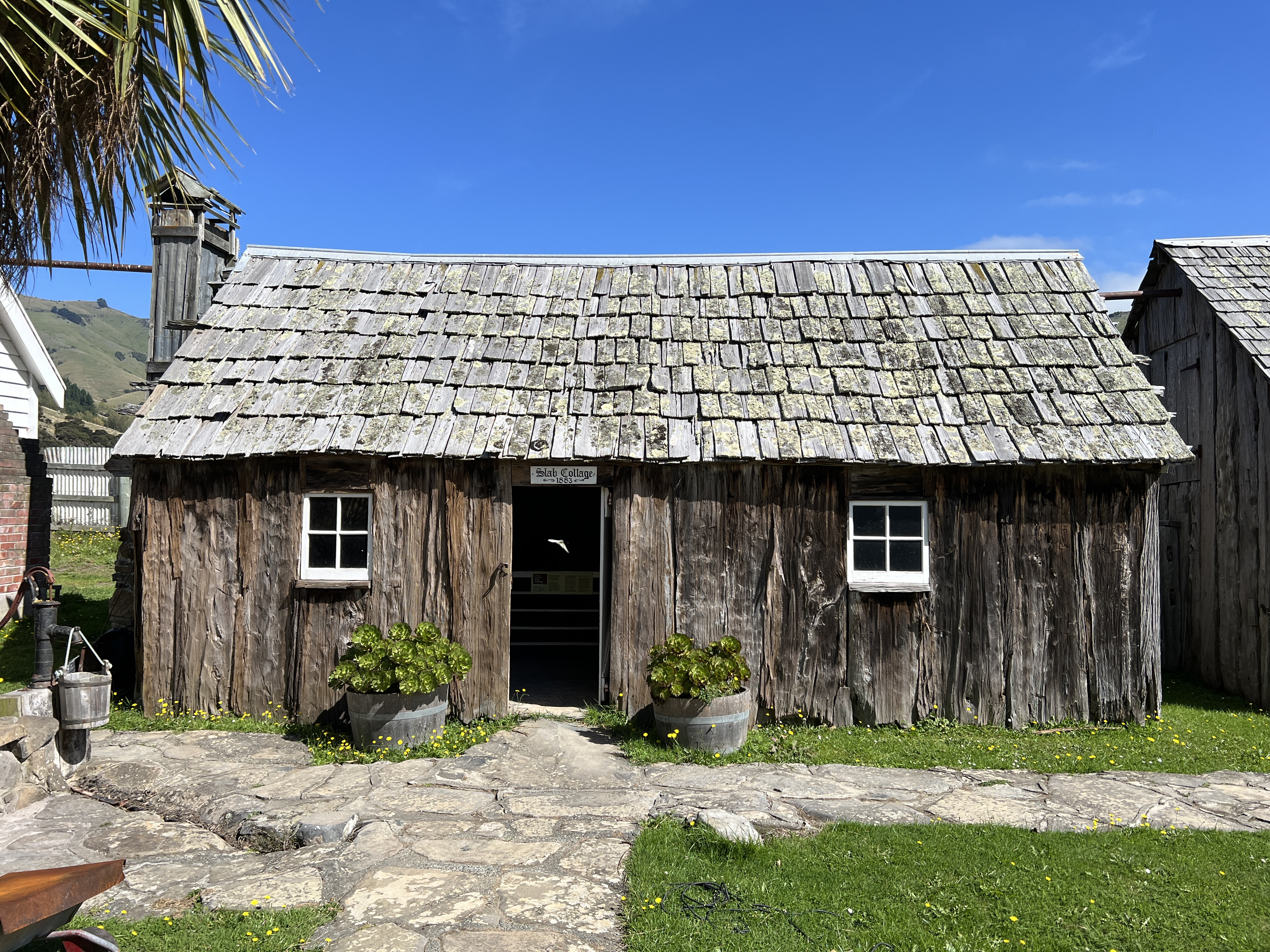
The Kaituna Valley slab hut, now at Okains Bay Museum

As increasing numbers of the public began picnicking at the reserve, Forest and Bird erected notices prohibiting camping, fires, and collecting plants. Despite this, in 1959 one visitor was caught collecting ferns and taken to court, convicted and discharged (without a fine). The Society lamented the poor response to its appeals for volunteers, and noted the burden on the few members patrolling the reserve to prevent vandalism by picnickers and the theft of plants. In 1960 the Jensen House, a slab hut in the upper Kaituna Valley built in the 1880s, was offered to Forest and Bird if they would relocate it to the Scenic Reserve; the job was deemed too difficult. (The hut was destroyed in the 1968 storm and reassembled at Okains Bay Museum.)

Possums were a significant problem in the reserve, and Forest and Bird members controlled them initially until the Banks Peninsula Rabbit Board took responsibility. Pest control has been ongoing in the area, with multiple agencies including the Department of Conservation and community groups working to eliminate rats, feral cats, mustelids and possums. A working group of volunteers (14 in 2009) continues to control weeds and plant native trees in the reserve. Today the reserve contains a picnic area, tables, and a toilet, but no potable water; fireplaces initially built there have since been removed.

== See also ==
- Conservation in New Zealand
- Banks Peninsula
