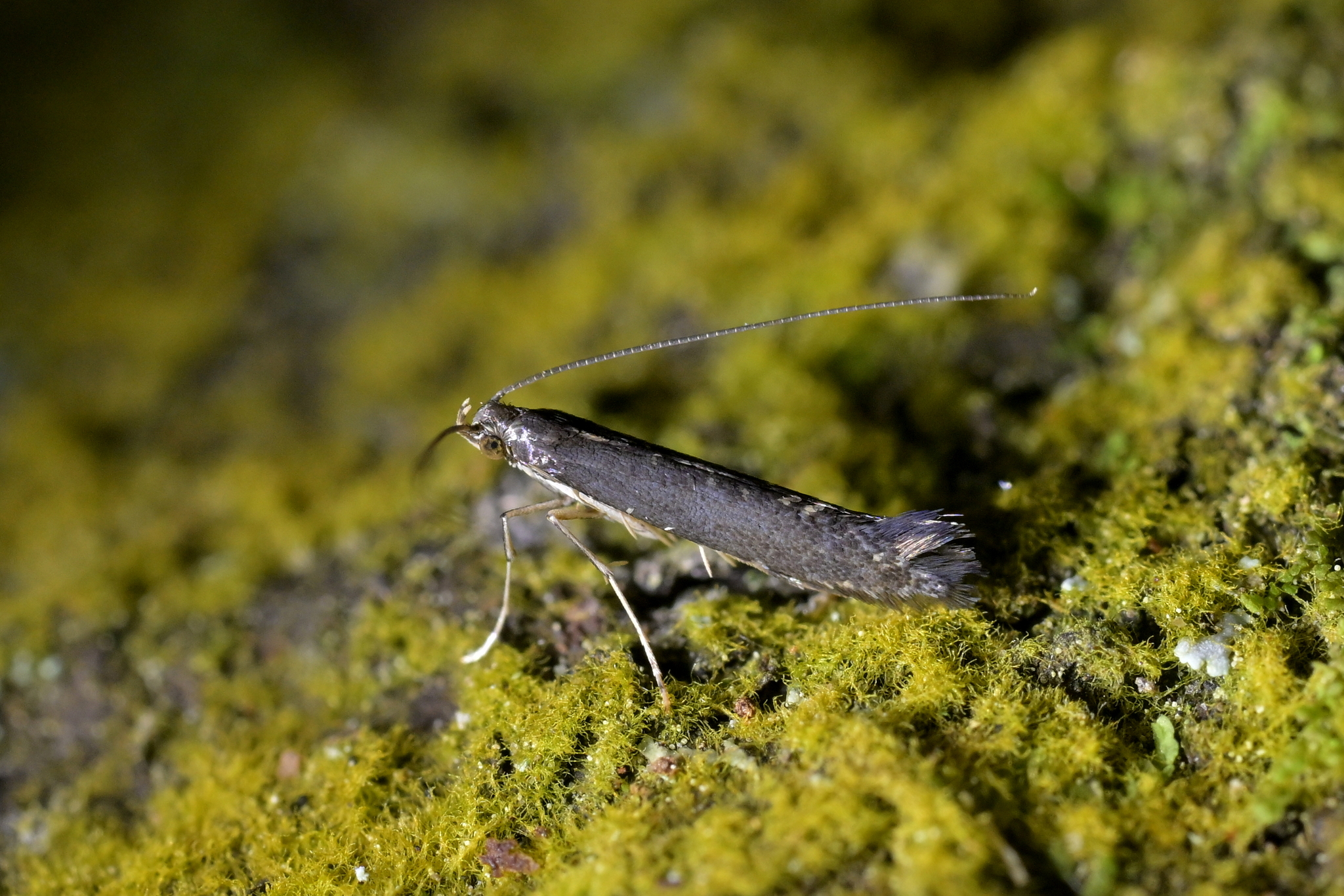

Scientific classification
- Kingdom: Animalia
- Phylum: Arthropoda
- Clade: Pancrustacea
- Class: Insecta
- Order: Lepidoptera
- Family: Gracillariidae
- Genus: Eumetriochroa
- Species: E. aethalota

Binomial name
- Eumetriochroa aethalota (Meyrick, 1880)

Synonyms
- Gracillaria aethalota Meyrick, 1880; Acrocercops aethalota (Meyrick, 1880)

= Eumetriochroa aethalota =

Species of moth

Eumetriochroa aethalota is a species of moth of the family Gracillariidae, known from New Zealand. This species was originally described by Edward Meyrick in 1880. In 2019 Robert Hoare proposed that this species be provisionally assigned to the genus Eumetriochroa. However as this proposal needs further investigation this species is also currently known as Eumetriochroa (s.l.) aetholata.

The larval host plants are species in the genus Parsonsia including Parsonsia capsularis and Parsonsia heterophylla. The larvae mine both the stems and leaves of these plants.
