= Kaituna River (disambiguation) =

Kaituna River may refer to the following in New Zealand:

- Kaituna River, river in the Bay of Plenty
- Kaituna River (Canterbury), river on Banks Peninsula
- Kaituna River (Marlborough), river in Marlborough
- Kaituna River (Tasman), river in Tasman District
