= Kaituna River (Canterbury) =

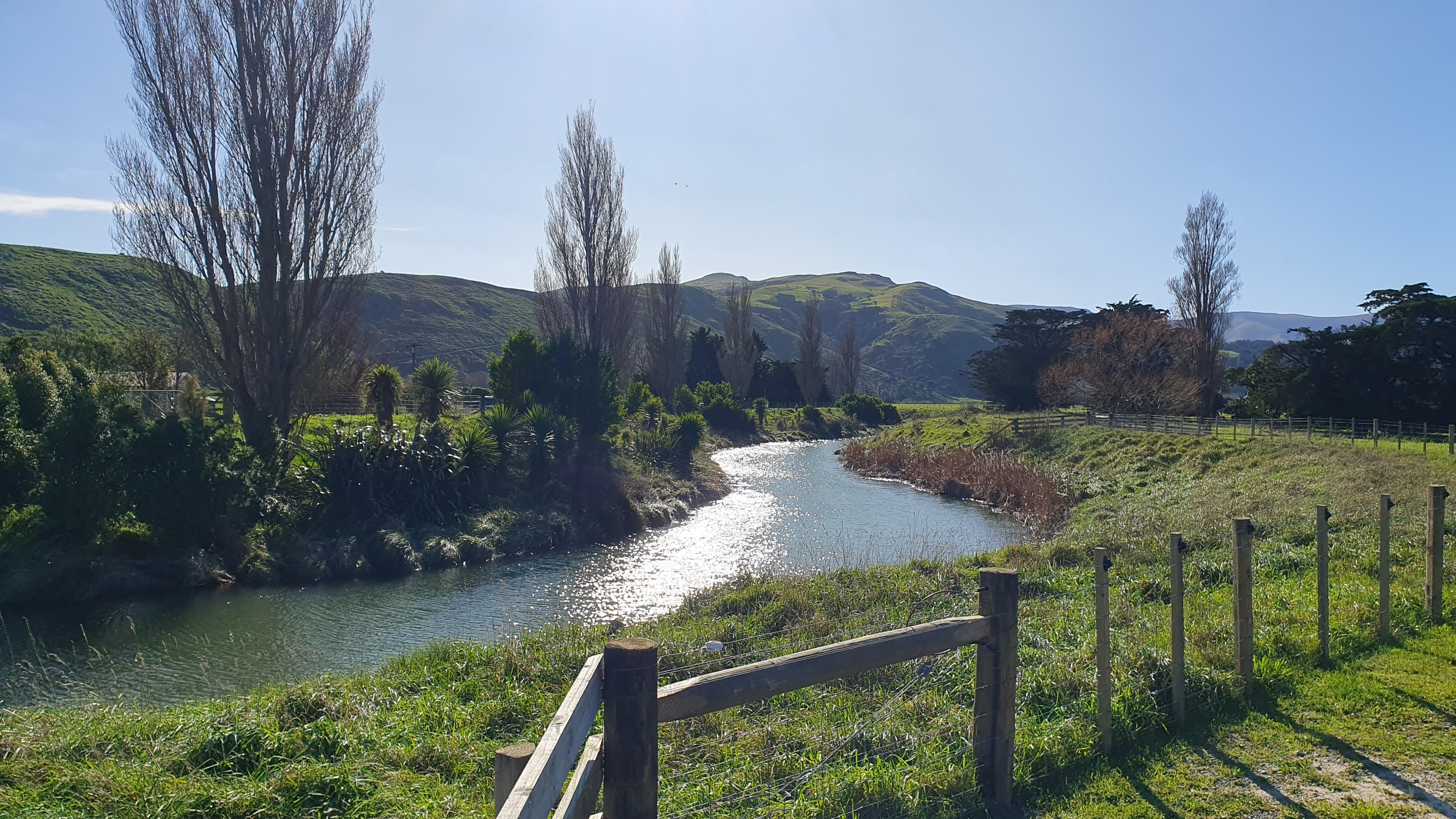
- Kaituna River near State Highway 75

- Location of the Kaituna River Kaituna River (Canterbury) (New Zealand)
- Etymology: From Māori: Kai (meaning food) and tuna (meaning eel)

Location
- Country: New Zealand
- Region: Canterbury
- Territorial area: Christchurch City

Physical characteristics
- Source: Mount Herbert / Te Ahu Pātiki
  - coordinates: 43.701745°S 172.758679°E
  - elevation: 670 metres (2,200 ft)
- Mouth: Lake Ellesmere / Te Waihora
  - coordinates: 43.77836°S 172.651005°E
  - elevation: 2 metres (6 ft 7 in)
- Length: 18 kilometres (11 mi)

Basin features
- Tributaries
  - left: Okana Stream

The Kaituna River is a small watercourse on Banks Peninsula, New Zealand, which discharges into Lake Ellesmere / Te Waihora. Its source is several small streams arising on the southern slope of Mount Herbert / Te Ahu Pātiki, and it flows south-west for 15 kilometres, being joined by the Okana Stream, and ending in the remains of Kaituna Lagoon (Māori: Motumotuao). The river gives its name to the steep sheep-grazed Kaituna Valley which provides access to the walking tracks and mountain tops of Mount Bradley and Mt Herbert.

The Māori name Kaituna, or "a place to eat eels", referred the river. The river and its valley were a traditional ara tawhito (travel route) for Māori living on Banks Peninsula, providing a relatively easy route to connect mahinga kai (food gathering sites) at Te Waihora with the more established settlements around Whakaraupō and Koukourarata to the north.

== Fauna ==
The river contains at least six species of native fish, including lamprey (Geotria australis), longfin eel (Anguilla dieffenbachii), shortfin eel (Anguilla australis), common bully (Gobiomorphus cotidianus), bluegill bully (G. hubbsi), and īnanga (Galaxias maculatus).

Pūteketeke or Australasian crested grebe have been recorded nesting in willows in the lower Kaituna, one of the only two lowland rivers in New Zealand where they are known to breed (the other is the Okana River at Little River). These rivers represent the easternmost limit of this threatened species, which normally nests in clear alpine lakes further inland. Between 2006 and 2015 the number of nesting pairs rose from 5 to 11 and dropped back to a single pair; the Department of Conservation built floating nesting platforms to be monitored with trail cameras. The Kaituna River also supports populations of pied shag (Phalacrocorax varius) and black shag (P. carbo), which nest in a large colony in a shelterbelt near the river mouth; royal spoonbill also roost there. Little shags (P. melanoleucos), black swans, mallard ducks, New Zealand scaup, and pūkeko have also been recorded on the river.

== Water quality ==
The water quality of the river has been monitored since 1992. In 2014–2015 the upper reaches of the river displayed low levels of sediment and ammonia, but the tributary Okana Stream and the river's mouth both had elevated sediment (through trampling by stock), and the entire river had such high levels of faecal coliforms (E. coli) that swimming was considered a public health risk—the source was either leaking septic tanks or stock accessing the waterway. Nevertheless, the dissolved nitrogen/ammonia levels of the river improved sufficiently from 2010 to 2015 that it won the Morgan Foundation award in 2015 for most improved river in Canterbury.

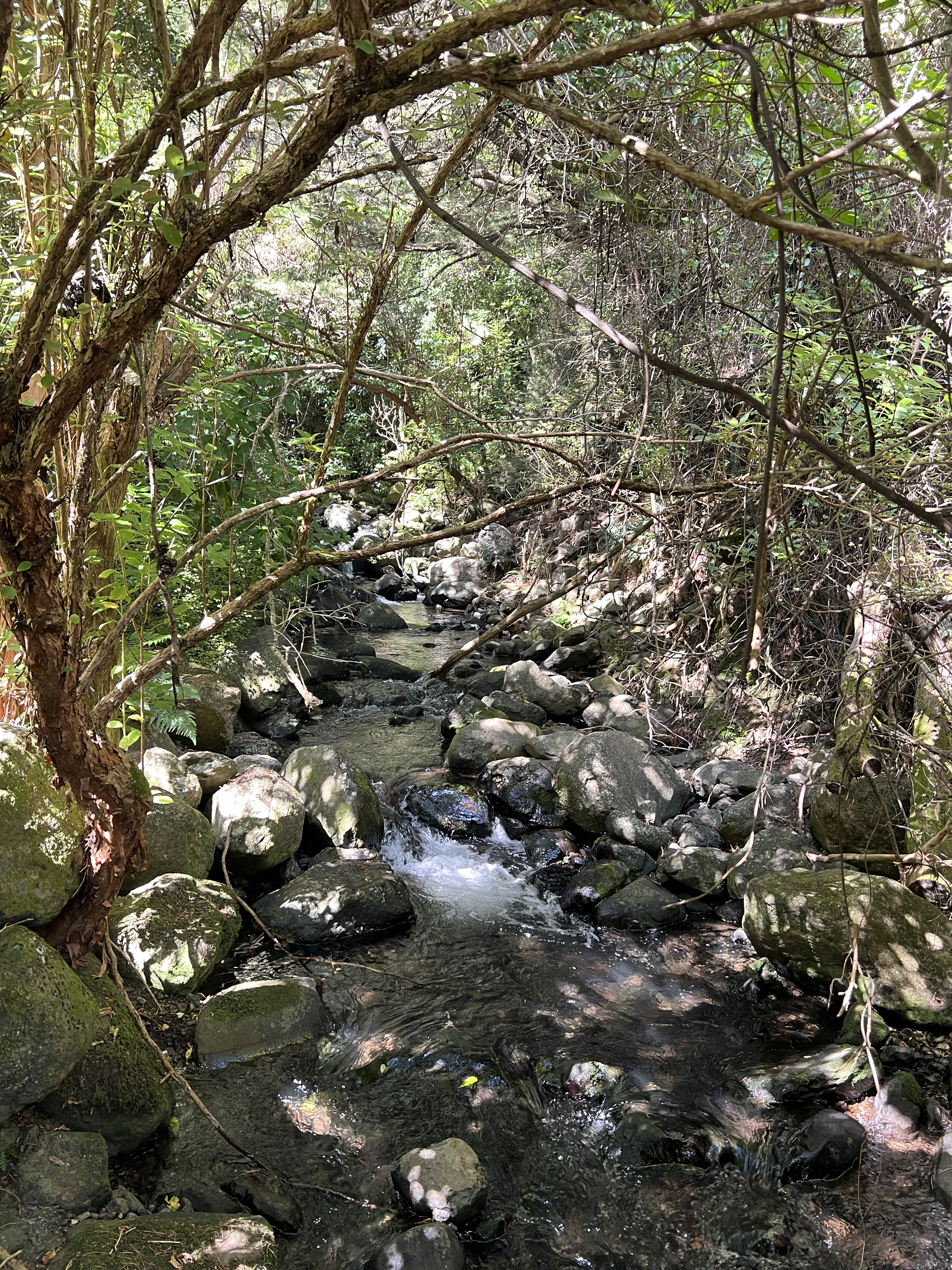
Upper valley

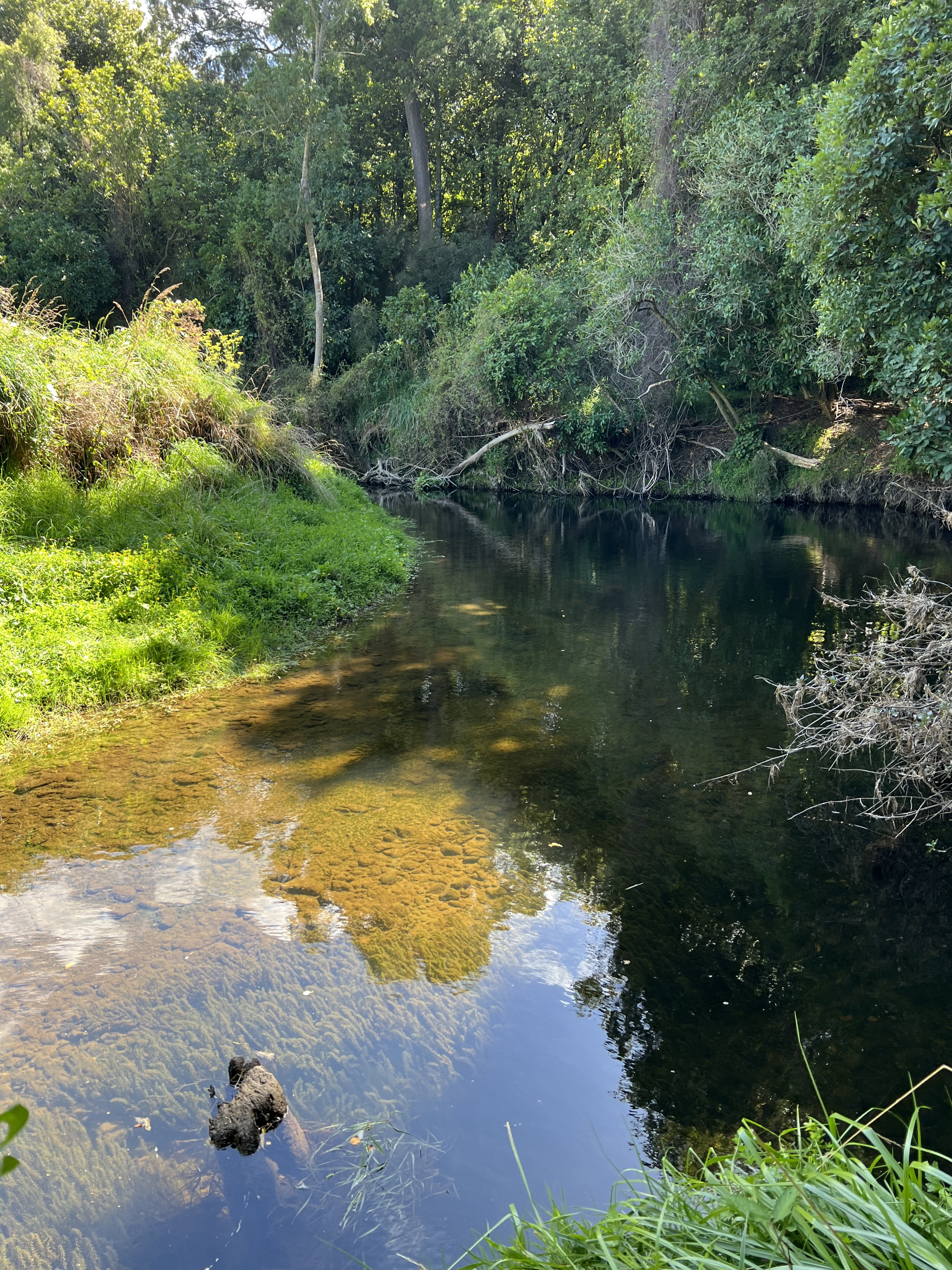
In Kaituna Valley Scenic Reserve

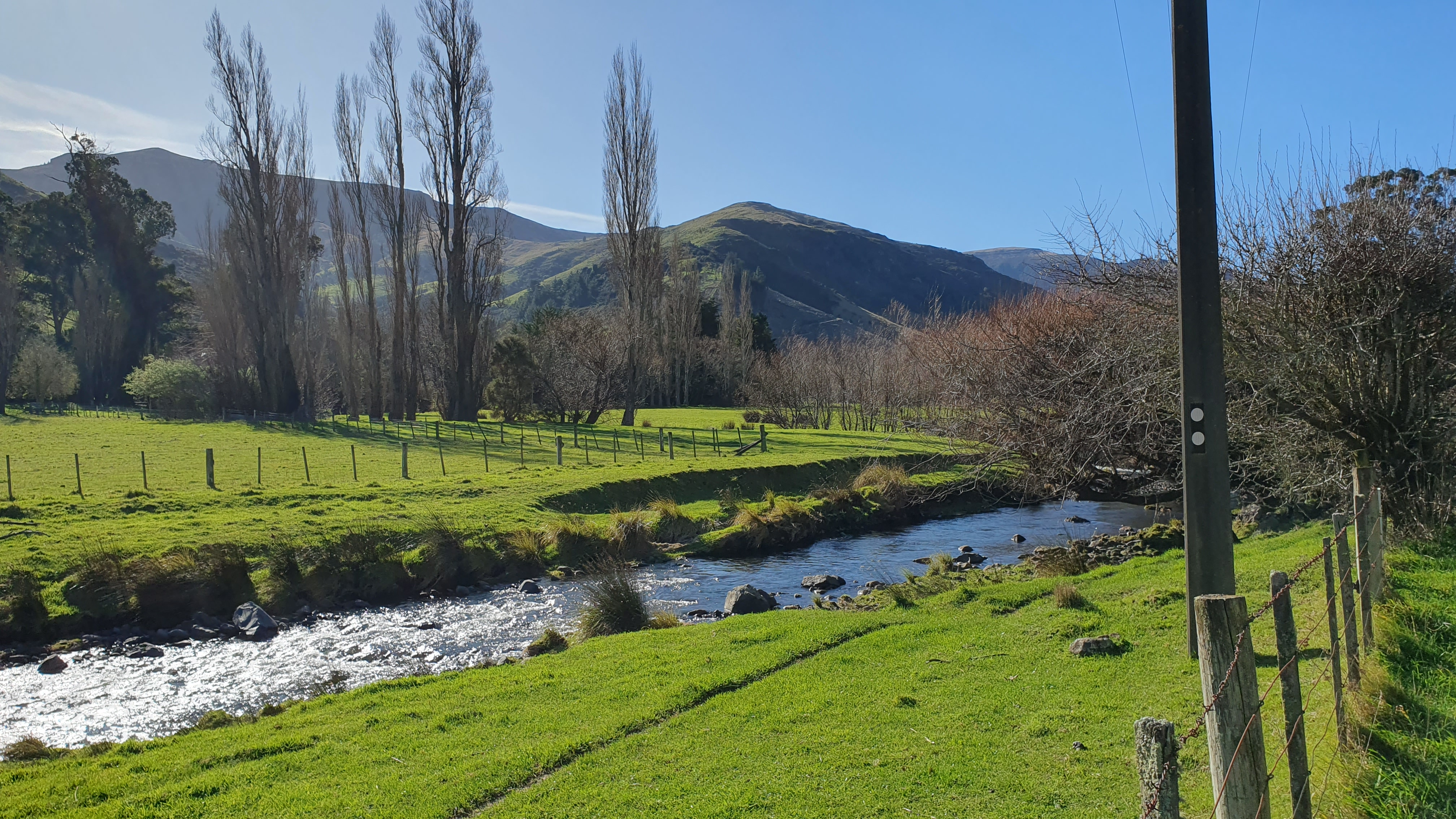
In the lower valley
