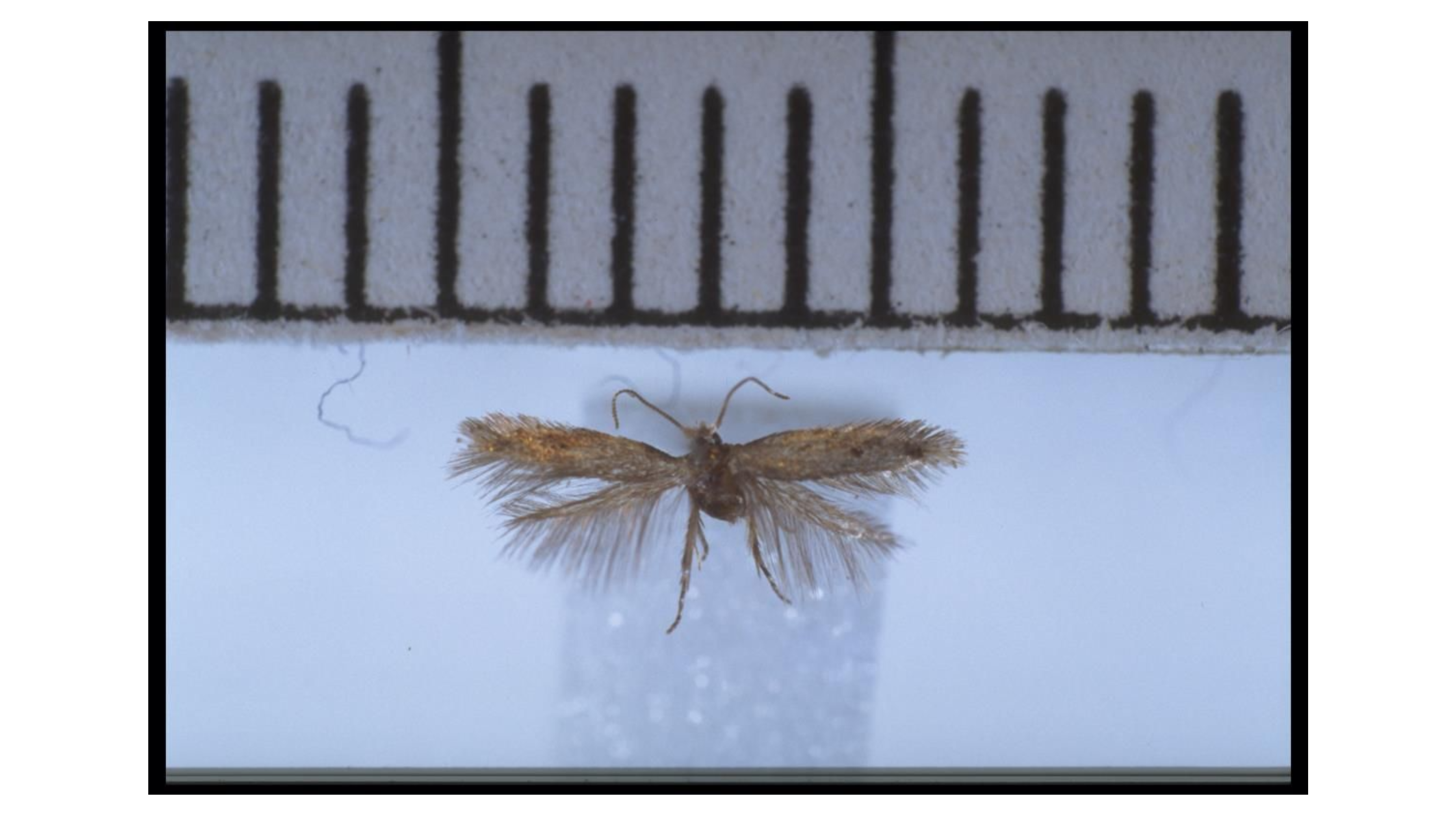
- Male holotype

Scientific classification
- Kingdom: Animalia
- Phylum: Arthropoda
- Clade: Pancrustacea
- Class: Insecta
- Order: Lepidoptera
- Family: Nepticulidae
- Genus: Stigmella
- Species: S. kaimanua

Binomial name
- Stigmella kaimanua Donner & Wilkinson, 1989

= Stigmella kaimanua =

Species of moth endemic to New Zealand

Stigmella kaimanua is a moth of the family Nepticulidae. This species is endemic to New Zealand and has been observed in the southern parts of the South Island. S. kaimanua inhabits lowland and lower montane forest. The larvae mine the leaves of Parsonsia heterophylla. The mine is linear and continues down the stems for a short distance. Larvae have been observed April to August. The cocoon is probably attached to the leaf litter on the ground under the host plant. There is one generation per year. Adults are on the wing in November and December and are attracted to light.

== Taxonomy ==
This species was first described in 1989 by Hans Donner and Christopher Wilkinson from specimens collected in Fiordland, Otago and Southland. The male holotype specimen, collected at Woodhaugh, Dunedin on 5 November 1982 by B.H. Patrick, is held in the New Zealand Arthropod Collection.

== Description ==
The larvae of S. kaimanua are 3–4 mm long and whitish yellow.

Donner and Wilkinson described the male of this species as follows:

Head. Frontal tuft pale brown; scape white; collar grey; antenna brown-grey, with about 30 segments. Thorax brown. Forewing about 3 millimetres (0.12 in). long, grey-brown in various shades, with 3 black spots - antemedial, medial, and apical; a blackish-brown area basally, near costa; fringe grey. Hindwing silvery grey; cilia concolorous. Abdomen brown-grey.

The female of the species is similar appearance to the male but has larger and darker forewings and antenna with 24 segments.

== Distribution ==
This species is endemic to New Zealand. S. kaimanua has been observed in the mid to southern parts of the South Island.

== Behaviour ==
Larvae mine the leaves of their host plant. Adults have been recorded in November and December. There is one generation per year. Adults are attracted to light.

== Habitat and hosts ==
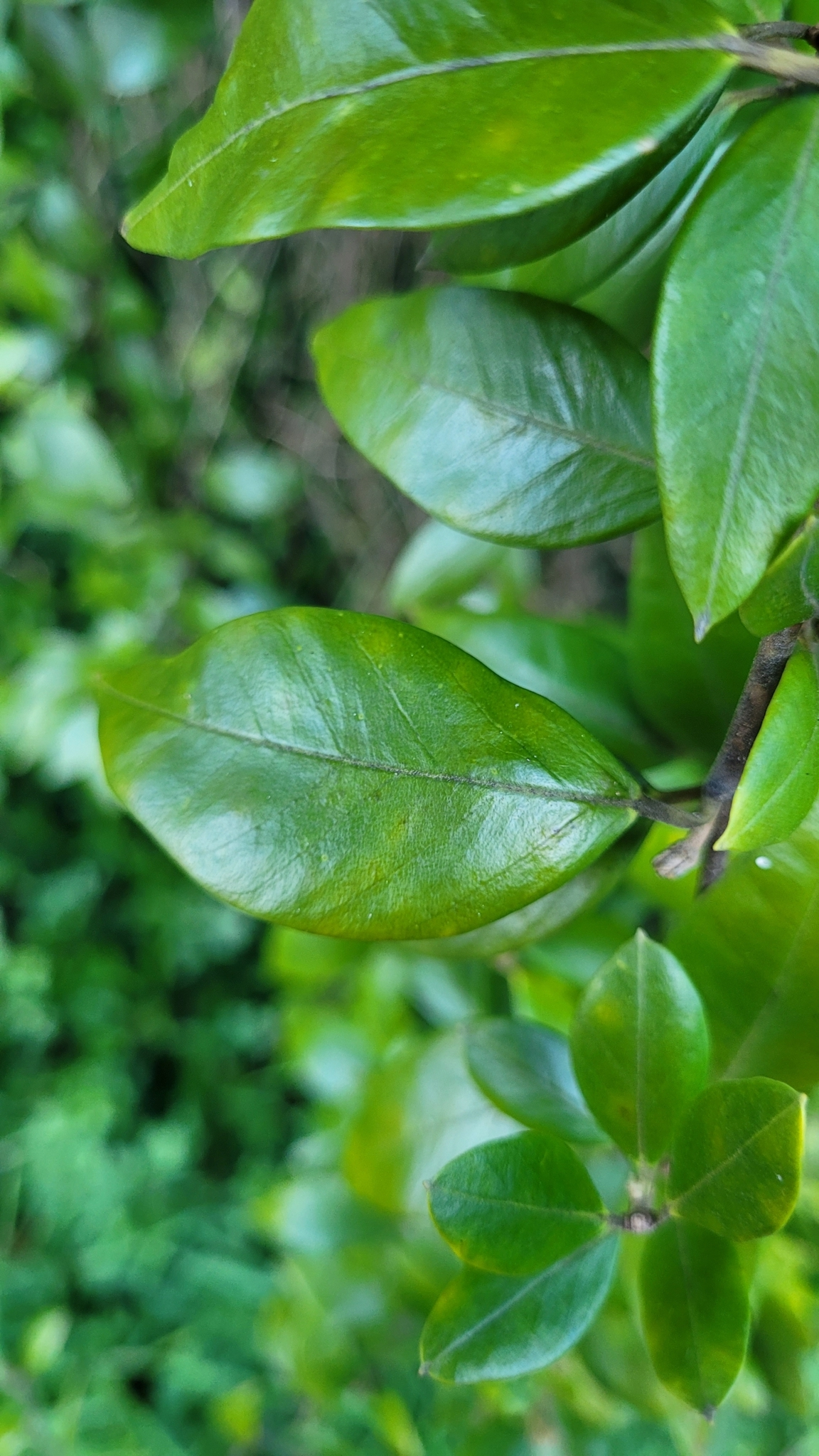
Leaves of the larval host P. heterophylla.

S. kaimanua inhabits lowland and lower montane forest. The larvae feed on Parsonsia heterophylla.
