= Orton Bradley Park =

Park in Charteris Bay, New Zealand

Coordinates: 43.65647°S 172.70604°E

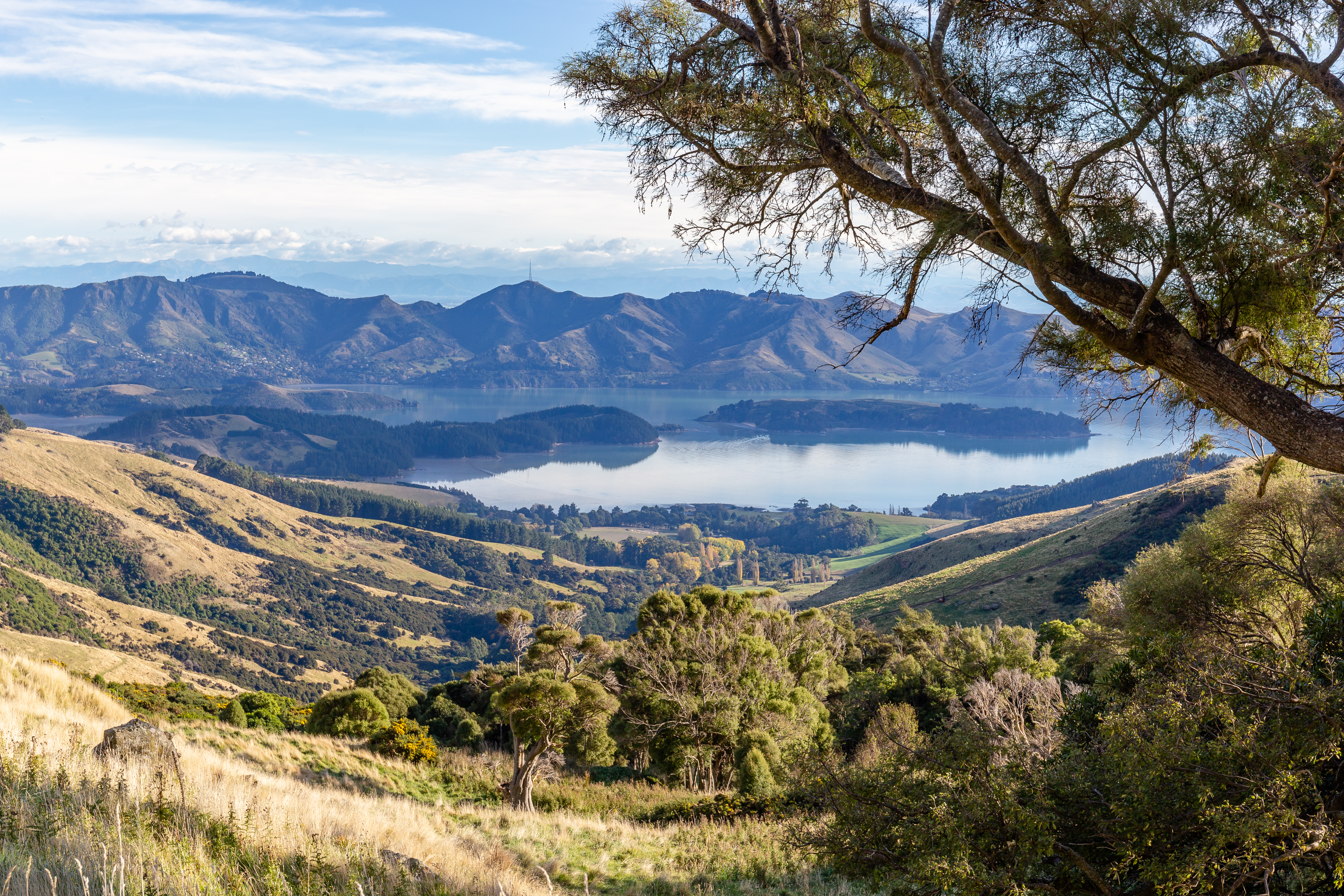
Orton Bradley Park with Lyttelton Harbour in the background

Orton Bradley Park is a forest park of some 650 hectares (1,600 acres) with its entrance close to the south shore of Lyttelton Harbour / Whakaraupō in New Zealand. It is managed as a not-for-profit private enterprise with a board of governors appointed by local communities and a chair appointed by the Government of New Zealand.

== History ==
The area of the park was first established as one of the earliest agricultural estates on the Banks Peninsula. Dr Thomas Richard Moore bought 50 acres of land in 1852 on which he built a substantial cottage. By 1858 he had acquired a further 150 acres and converted the cottage into dairy. Rev Reginald Robert Bradley, who had arrived from Kirkby Stephen in England bought the Moore estate and added further land so by 1866 he possessed some 1600 acres. In 1892 Orton Bradley himself came into the estate on the death of his father. He had an interest in forestry and, what would now be called, ecology. He planted a wide range of native and exotic trees to try and determine the types of trees that would thrive in the dry maritime conditions of the Banks Peninsula. Many of the trees remain, including some specimens of Eucalyptus lining the entrance drive, some of which are reputed to be amongst the largest in New Zealand.

Bradley died in 1943 when the whole area, which at that time amounted to 1612 acres 2 roods 29 perches, was passed to a trust for the land to be used for the benefit of the people of New Zealand, but which also allowed two cousins, Alec and Roy Anderson, to retain a financial interest until their deaths. The trust at that time consisted of a number of mayors of nearby local authorities, the curator of Christchurch Botanic Gardens, the chairman of the Automobile Association of Canterbury and the president of the Canterbury Horticultural Society. In 1972 the trust membership was updated by a New Zealand law to reflect the changes in local authorities and the changing socio-economic status of the area, with the new chair appointed by the Governor General of New Zealand.

== Modern use ==
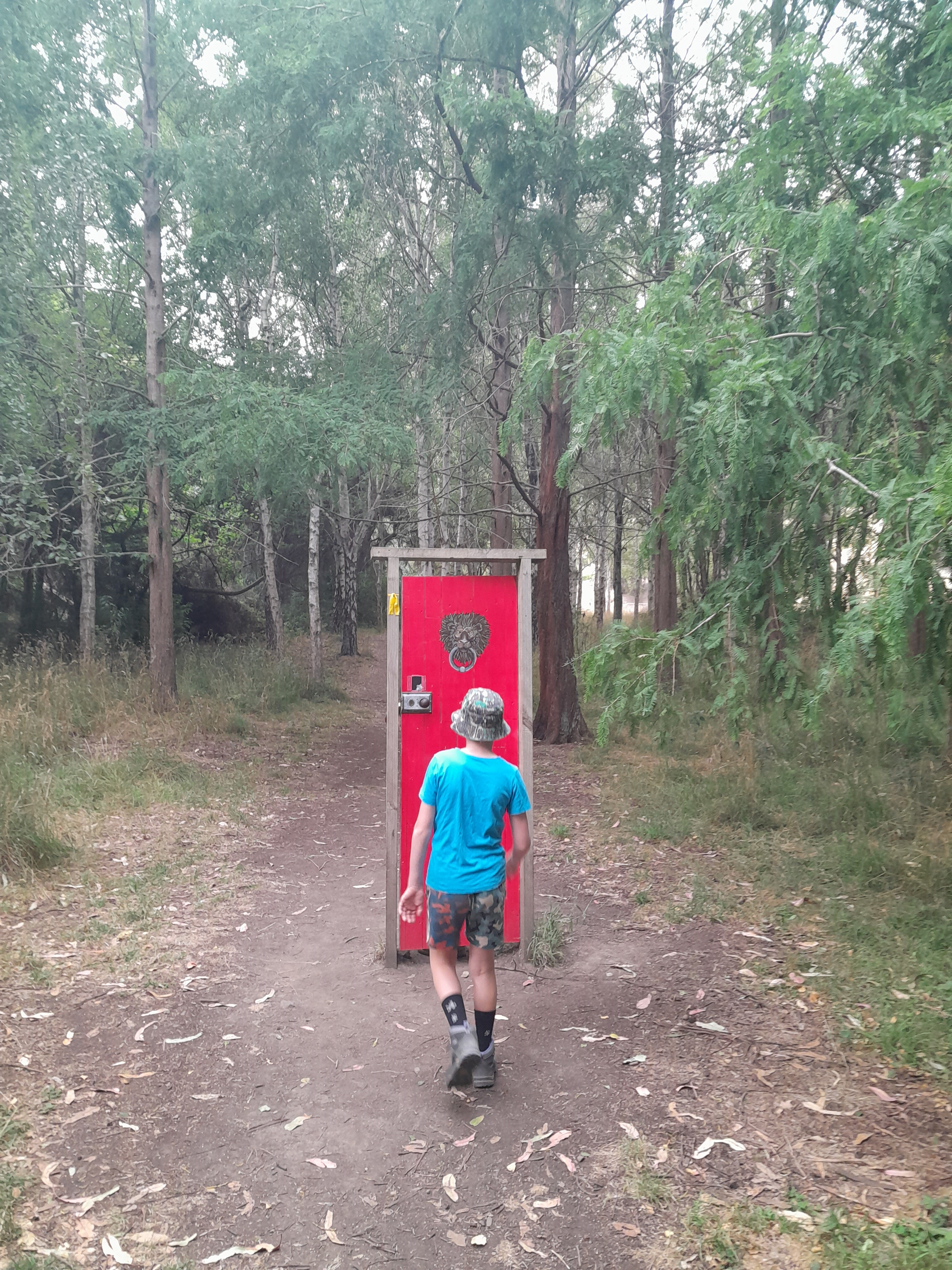
A red door leads to walking tracks at Orton Bradley park (2023)

The park is open to the public throughout the year and it provides a wide range of walks including a substantial part of one of the ascents of Mount Herbert / Te Ahu Pātiki. A camp site is provided and a range of semi naturalised gardens. A number of listed buildings remain on the site including a flax mill and leat, barns a cafe and reputedly the oldest stone building in Canterbury.
