= Okains Bay Museum =

Museum in Banks Peninsula, New Zealand

Coordinates: 43.7103°S 173.0415°E

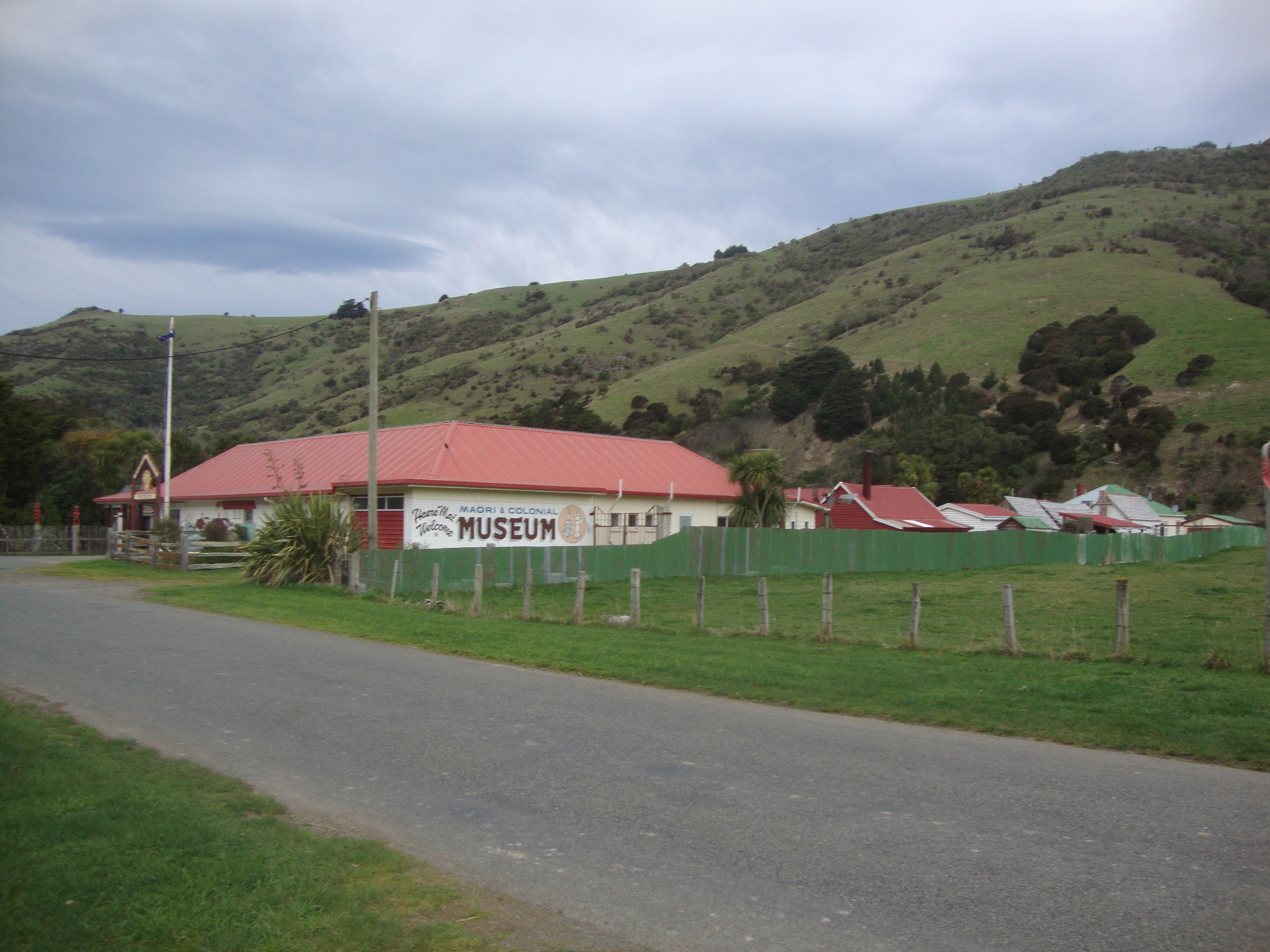
The museum in 2011

Okains Bay Museum is a museum in Banks Peninsula, New Zealand.

== History ==
As a child in the 1940s, Okains Bay resident Murray Thacker developed an interest in collecting historical objects and Māori history; he also learnt to speak Māori. He later repatriated Māori taonga from collections outside New Zealand, purchasing significant pieces from London-based collector Kenneth Athol Webster. Webster gifted Thacker some items, including a kāhu-kiwi with rare albino kiwi feathers from Te Tai Poutini.

Thacker set up a private museum at his home and in 1962 it was stated that about 2000 people visited each year. In 1964 Thacker bought a collection of 1000 Māori pieces from a private museum in Dargaville.

In 1968 he bought the former Okains Bay dairy factory, intending to create a public museum in which to house the taonga Māori collection alongside displays of early European artefacts. In 1973 Thacker was granted a permit to build a museum behind the dairy factory. In subsequent years additional buildings were added to the site including some originally belonging to early European settlers as well as a marae.

The Okains Bay Māori and Colonial Museum opened as a public museum controlled by a trust on Waitangi Day in 1977. The trust includes members from Thacker's family, Ngai Tahu as the tangata whenua, and people from the local community.

Thacker was awarded the Queen's Service Medal in 1977 for his service to the community.

== Collection ==
Thacker added the 'Jensen House', the remains of a pioneer dwelling from the Kaituna Valley, to his collection in 1961. Restoration of the house was completed in 1969.

The museum collection includes a number of historic canoes salvaged from around New Zealand. One of them, named 'Kaukaka', was bought by Thacker in 1968, shipped by rail from Waitotara near Wanganui to Okains Bay, and restored over a five-year period by carver John Rua. The canoe is of totara, 20 metres long, and thought to date from the 1870s. For many years Thacker would launch it on the river on Waitangi Day so that people could see the canoe in action.

In 2016, Dougal Austin and Matiu Baker from Te Papa Tongarewa assessed the taonga Māori at Okains Bay Museum and found them to be nationally significant. After facing financial difficulties post-Covid, the staffing was restructured and a new team was put in place. In 2023 the museum reported ongoing difficulties with funding maintenance.
