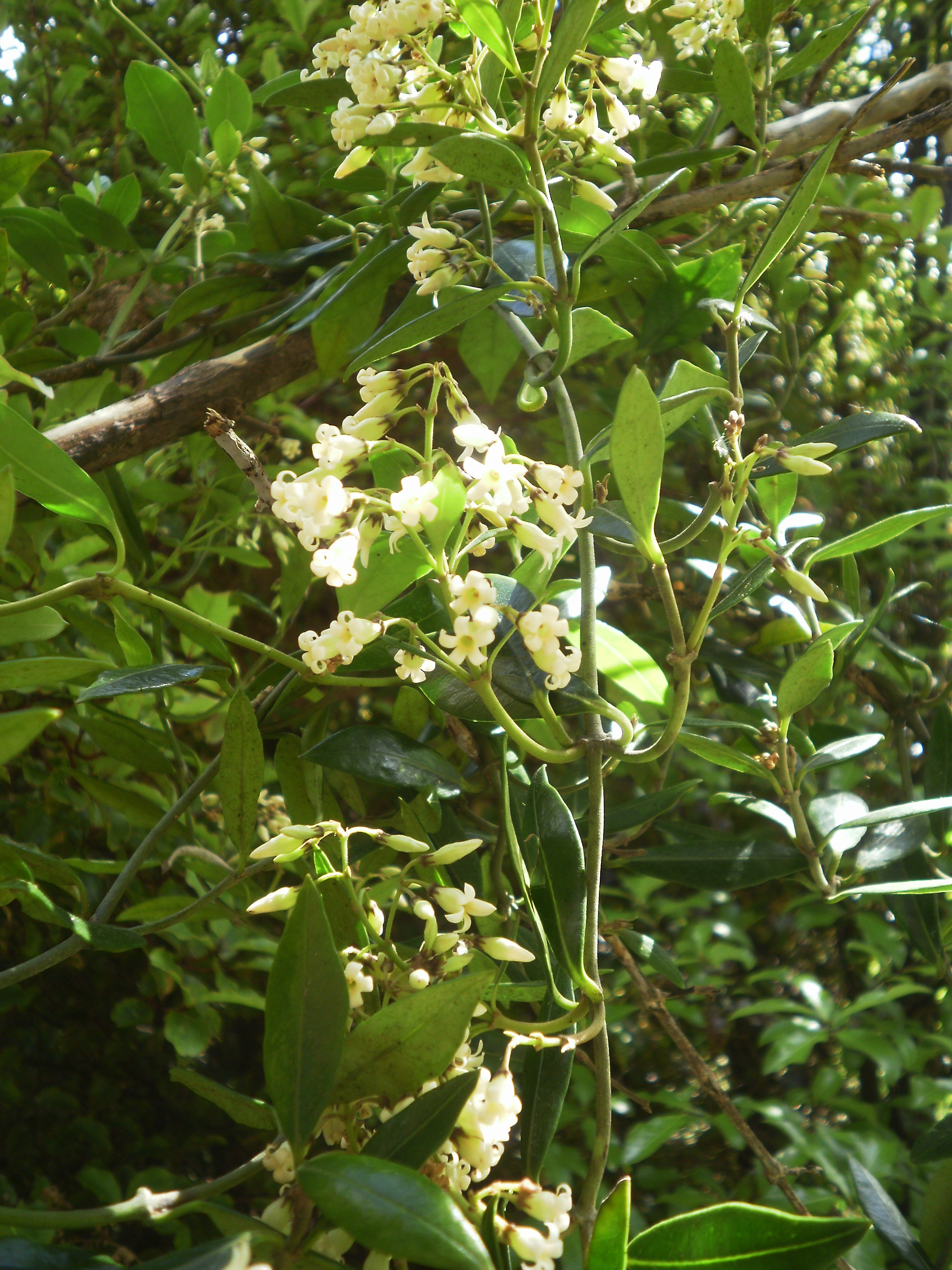

Scientific classification
- Kingdom: Plantae
- Clade: Tracheophytes
- Clade: Angiosperms
- Clade: Eudicots
- Clade: Asterids
- Order: Gentianales
- Family: Apocynaceae
- Genus: Parsonsia
- Species: P. heterophylla

Binomial name
- Parsonsia heterophylla A.Cunn.
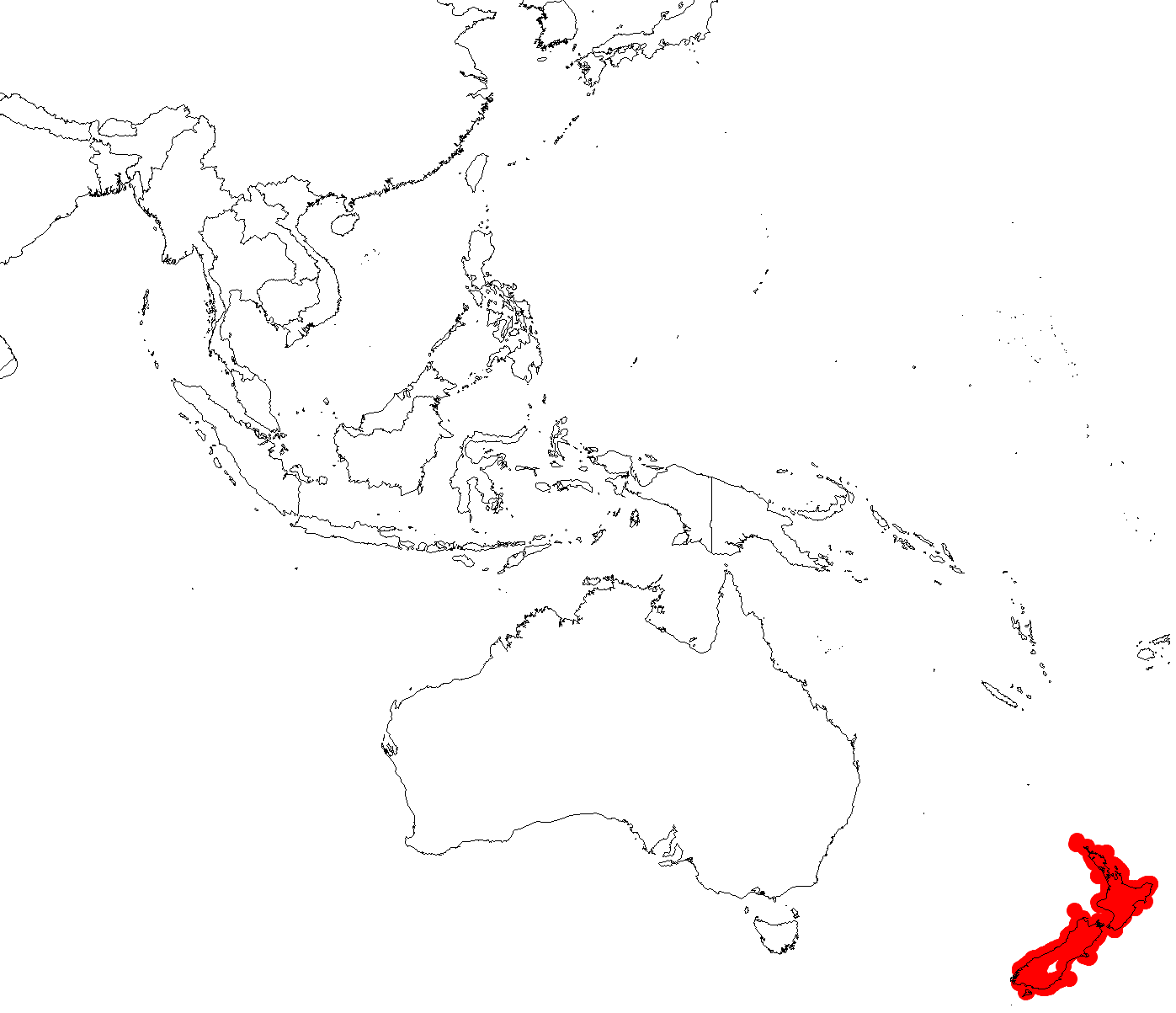
- Occurrence data from GBIF

= Parsonsia heterophylla =

Species of plant

Parsonsia heterophylla, commonly called New Zealand jasmine or kaihua, is a climbing plant endemic to New Zealand. It was first described by Alan Cunningham in 1839.

The name heterophylla comes from the differing leaf shapes that can be seen in seedlings and juvenile plants of the species. Heterophylla means varied leaves, from the Greek words heteros and phullon. Synonyms for this species include Parsonsia albiflora Raoul and Parsonsia macrocarpa Colenso. It can also be described as "the varied-leaved Parsonsia". There are 40 species of Parsonsia found in Asia, Australasia and the Pacific. P. heterophylla is one of two endemic Parsonsia species found in New Zealand. It is more robust and has bigger flowers than its close relative, Parsonsia capsularis, which is also known as akakiore or small Māori jasmine.

Parsonsia variabilis Lindl. is listed as a synonym by the New Zealand Plant Conservation Network. However, IPNI and Plants of the World online list Parsonsia variabilis as a synonym of Parsonsia capsularis.

== Description ==
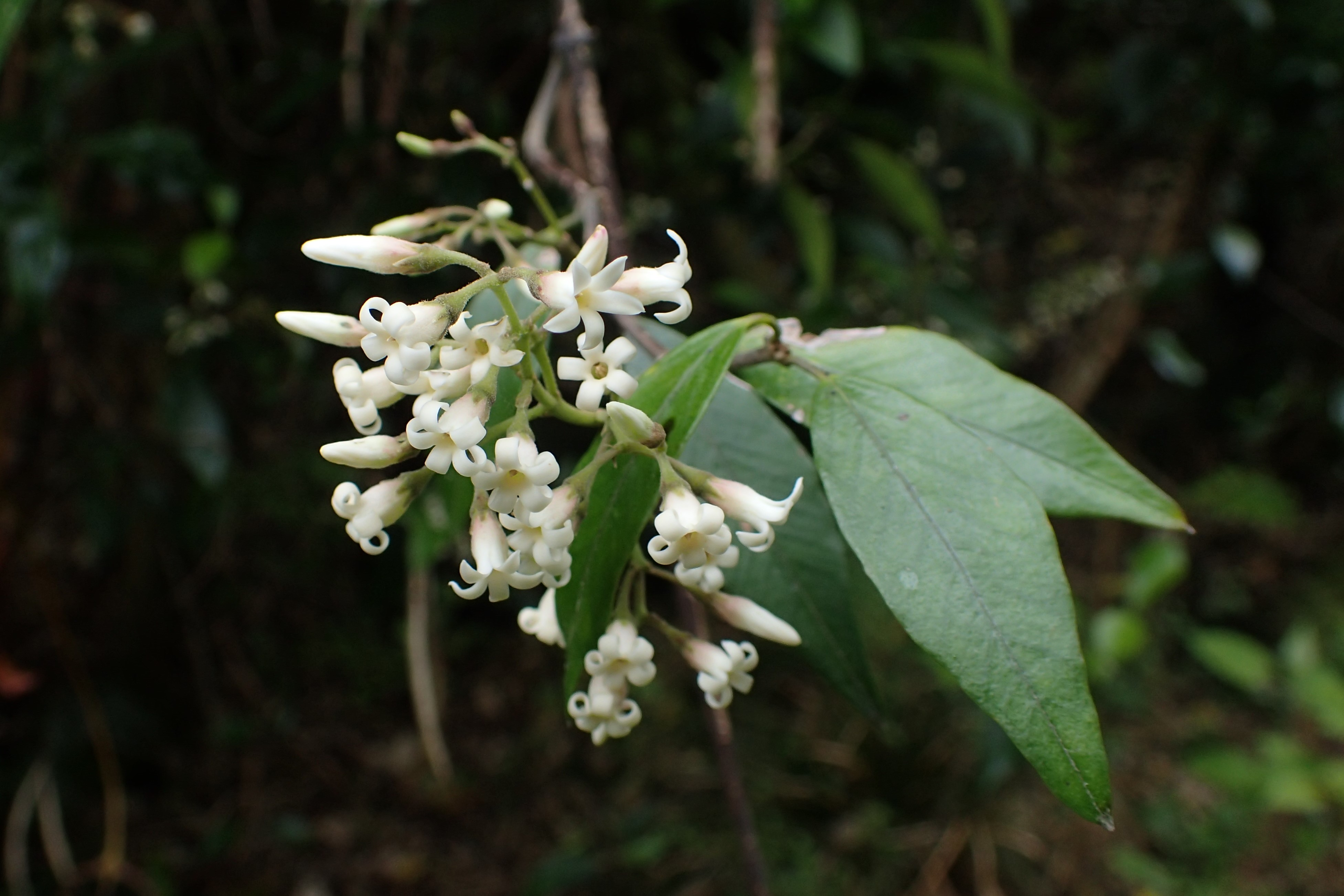
Flowers of Parsonsia heterophylla

The flowers of P. heterophylla are "white, scented, and tubular with anthers hidden within the tube." This species has also been observed rarely to have yellow flowers. They appear in many-flowered, fairly compact clusters on the plant. The flowers are small, each usually up to 8mm in size. The flowers are often described for their peculiar scent. Often seen draped over the tops of tall trees, the flowers are more recognisable by their scent than their appearance.

The fruit of P. heterophylla is a long, narrow pod that opens to release tufted seeds. These seeds pods are around 15 cm long. Each pod holds numerous seeds, and each one is tipped with a tuft of silky hairs. The two-valved pod opens from the tip downwards, bending outwards and raising seeds up so that their tufts can be caught by the wind. The fruit pods start green, turning to brown and then after the seeds have been dispersed, the dry, empty pods hang a long time on the plant.

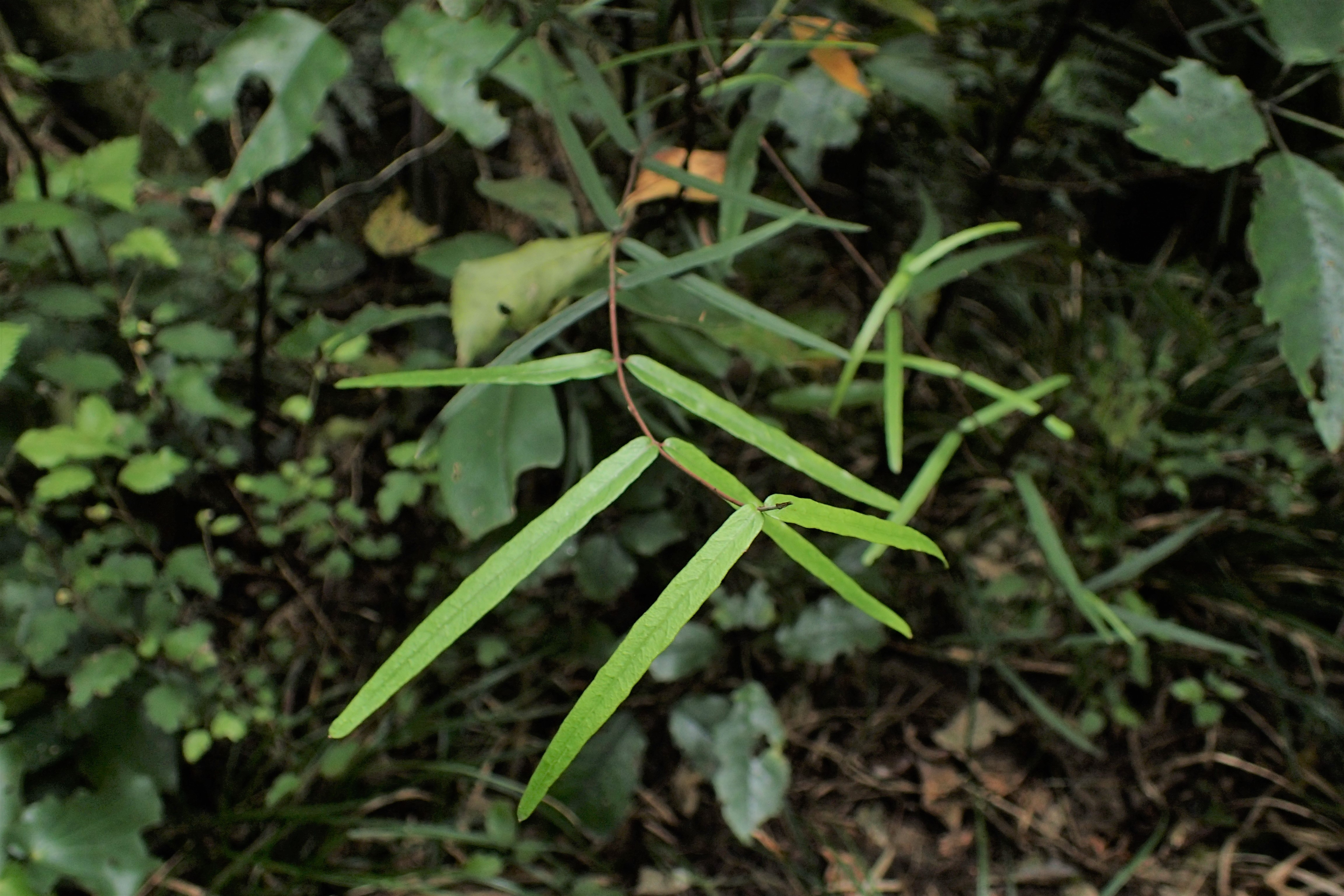
Long narrow leaf type

The leaves of P. heterophylla are variable in size and shape, both in all stages of its life. The leaves of seedlings and juvenile plants are largely diverse, and a range of small and round, long and narrow and irregularly shaped leaves can all be found mixed on the same plant. In adults, the leaves are described as "opposite, rather shiny and rather dark green from above, much paler underneath, more or less smooth-edge but often somewhat wavy edged, more than 1 cm wide, often 2, 3, or 4 cm wide and up to 10cm long". While the leaves of adult plants are usually shorter and broader than in juveniles, they are still variable in shape. The leaf types can narrowly be defined as small round, long narrow and moderately broad and oblong.

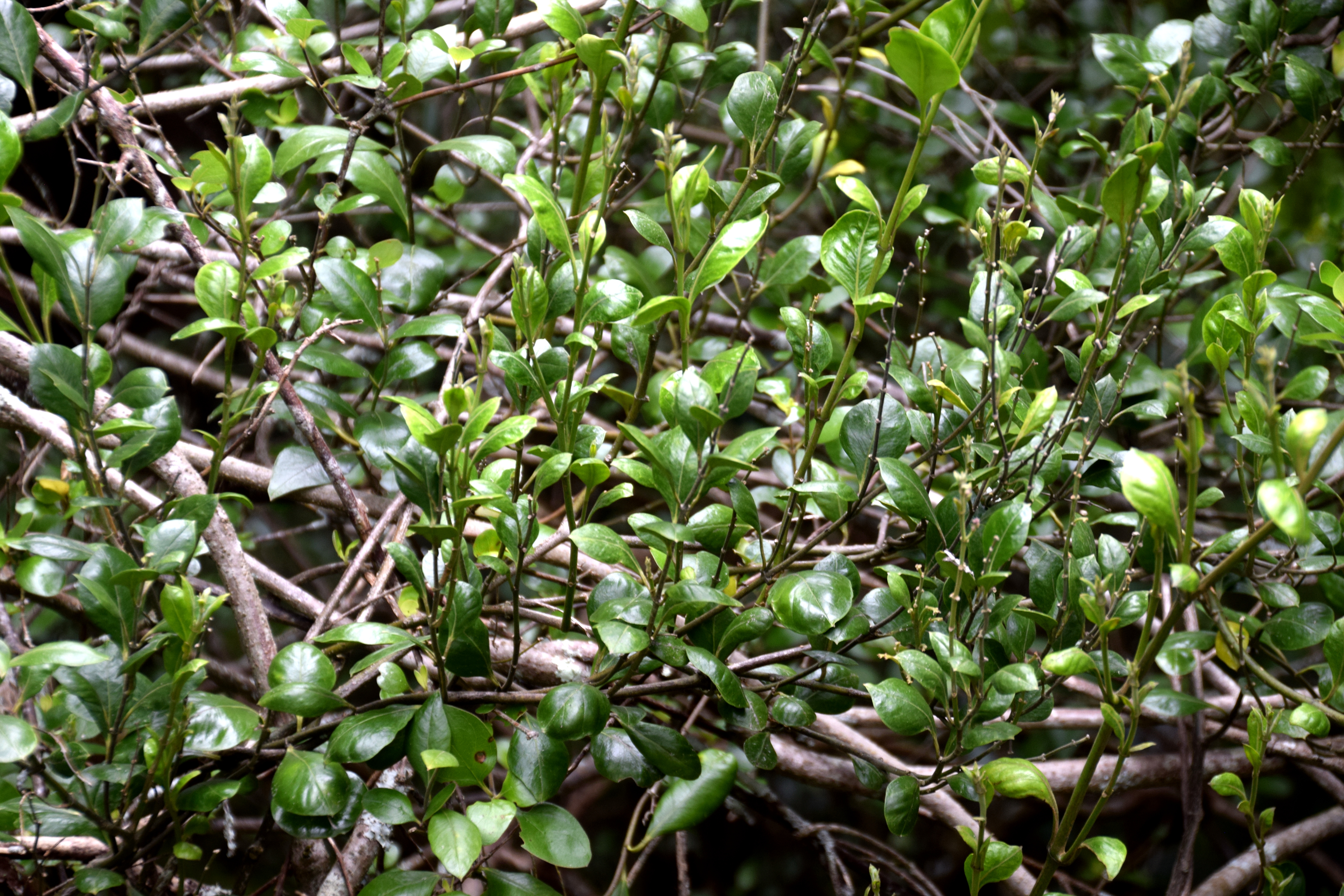
Small round leaf type

The twining stems of P. heterophylla are often tightly wrapped around host stems and are described as softly woody and flexible. In older plants, the stem is woody towards the base. Each stem is as thick as a quill and shining. This branching climber can reach up to 10 metres tall by climbing up any plant within reach.

== Distribution ==
P. heterophylla is an indigenous or endemic species of New Zealand, meaning that it is not found anywhere else in the world.

Its presence has been recorded in the North Island, South Island, Three Kings Islands and Stewart Island. It is commonly found across the country in lowland or low montane forest. Its preferred habitat is forest margins and clearings in coastal scrub patches. It has been observed to grow side by side with its close relative Parsonsia capsularis in the Banks Peninsula, where hybrids are sometimes encountered.

== Life cycle ==
There is little information available on the timeline and life cycle of this species. This plant flowers from September to March, followed by seed pods from February. Seeds are dispersed then by the wind.

For planting P. heterophylla in gardens, the optimal time to collect seeds is between February and April.

== Interactions ==
P. heterophylla twine their young stems around other plants in order and grow and climb towards the sunlight.

P. heterophylla is a host plant to a number of invertebrate species, including beetles, wasps, moths, butterflies, grasshoppers and sucking bugs. The larvae of the moth Stigmella kaimanua feed on the leaves of P. heterophylla. It also attracts the rare New Zealand ribbonwood aphid or Paradoxaphis plagianthi. The sweet-scented flowers of P. heterophylla are attractive to night-flying moths.

The nectar of P. heterophylla is eaten by the New Zealand bellbird or korimako.

== Further information ==
P. heterophylla's current conservation status is not threatened, according to the Department of Conservation.

The flowers of P. heterophylla were historically often bound by Māori to the perches of bird-traps as a lure.
