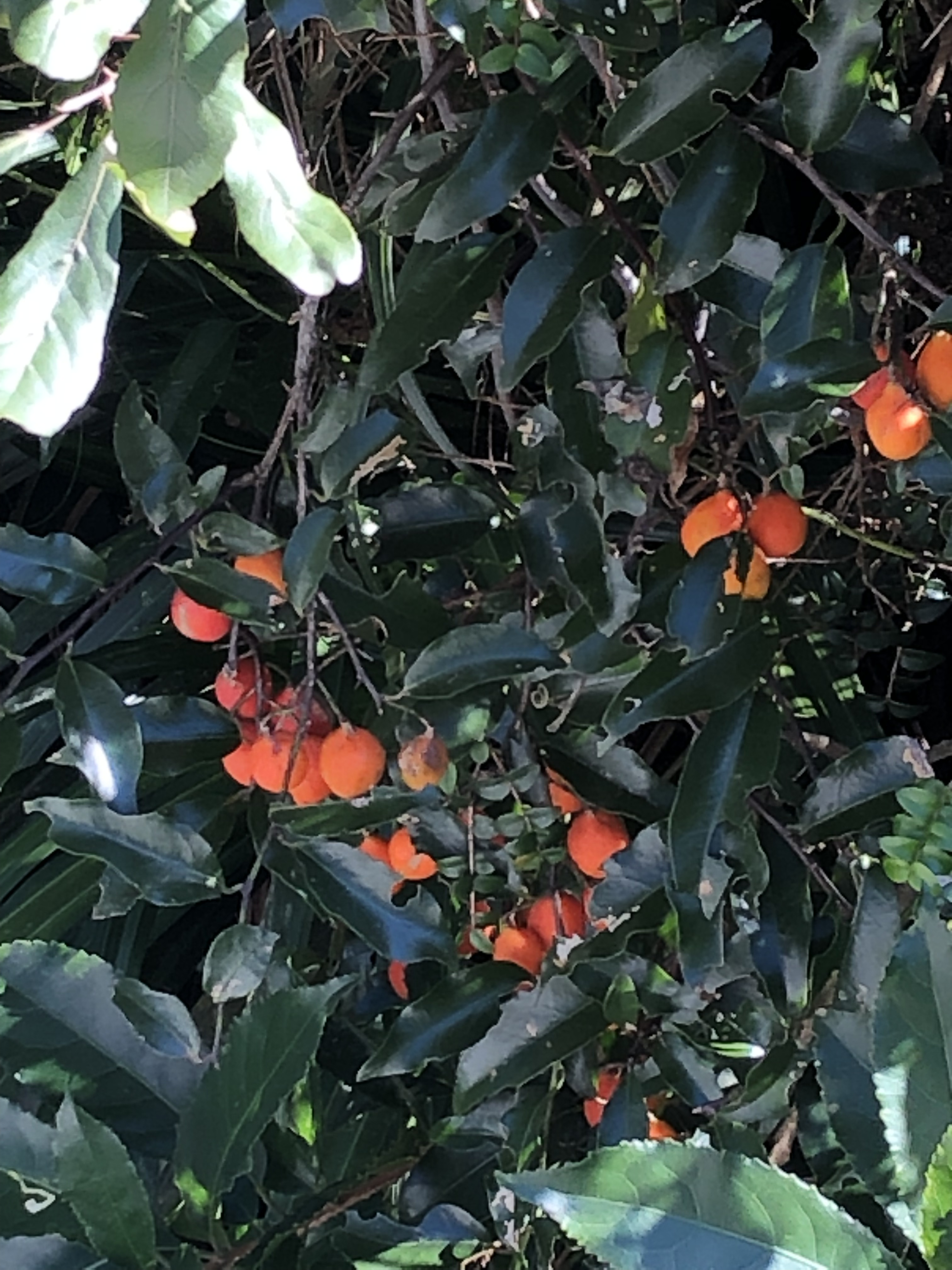

Scientific classification
- Kingdom: Plantae
- Clade: Tracheophytes
- Clade: Angiosperms
- Clade: Eudicots
- Clade: Rosids
- Order: Malpighiales
- Family: Passifloraceae
- Genus: Passiflora
- Species: P. tetrandra

Binomial name
- Passiflora tetrandra Banks ex DC.

Synonyms
- Tetrapathaea tetrandra (Banks ex DC.) Raoul

= Passiflora tetrandra =

Species of vine

Passiflora tetrandra (Māori: kōhia), also known as New Zealand passionflower, New Zealand passionfruit, or kohe, is a climbing vine found in New Zealand. Of the c. 500 species of passionflower, this is the sole species native to New Zealand.

== Overall ==
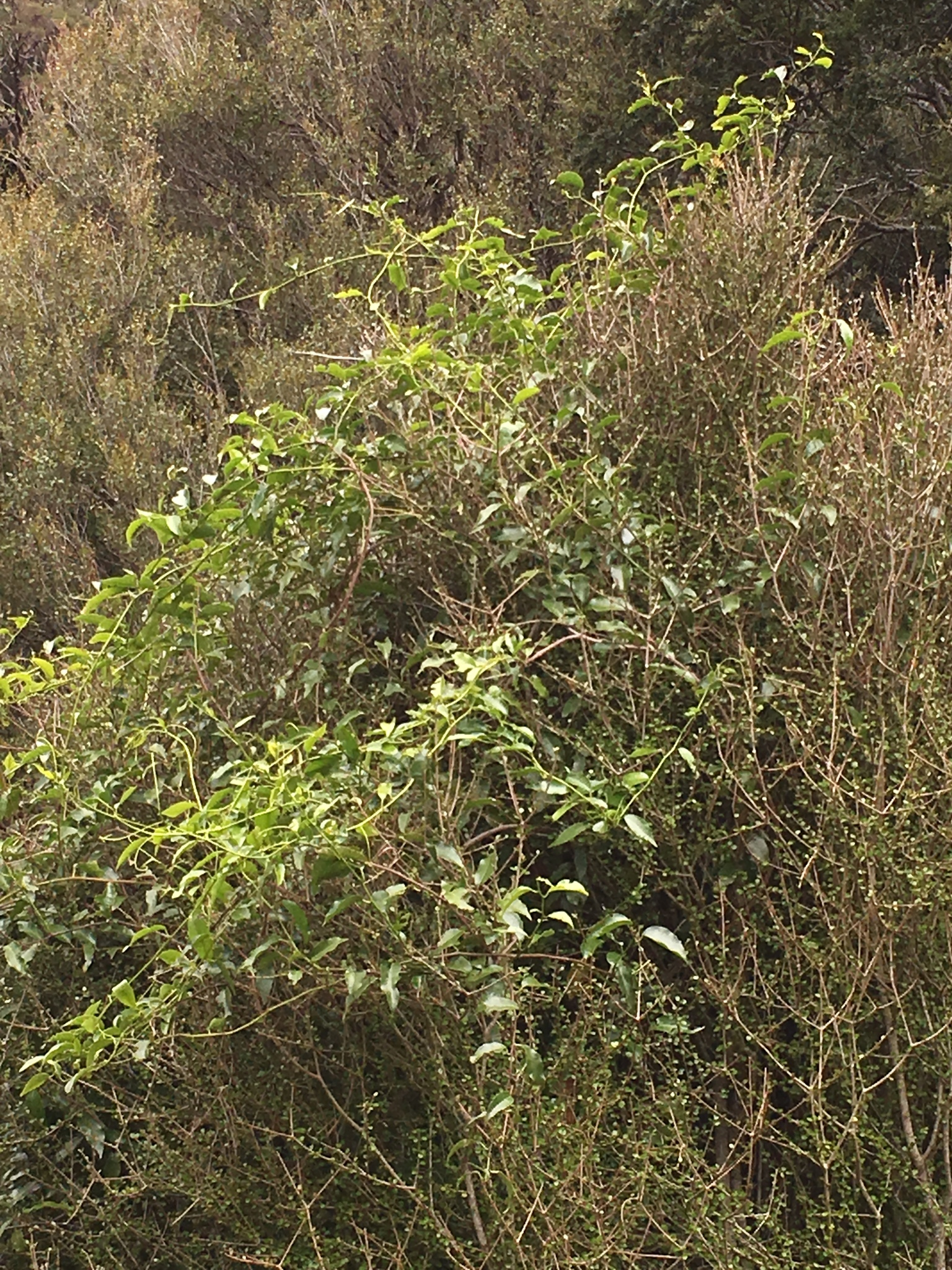
Passiflora tetrandra at the Wellington Botanic Garden

Kōhia is a forest vine, climbing up to 10 m (33 ft). Leaves are alternate, broadly lanceolate, green, shiny, and untoothed. Flowers are small, white to yellow, in groups of 1–3 in the axils of the leaves. Flowers appear between October and December.

Plants are dioecious: fruit may not be produced without female-flowering plants being fertilised with pollen from separate male-flowering plants. Lemon-shaped, orange fruits up to 30 mm (1.2 in) long can be found from summer to autumn. The fruit can be eaten by people and is a traditional food for Māori: the gum from the stem was also chewed. The seeds have a peppery taste.

Propagation is from seed or cutting. Cultivation requirements are basic: vines need a support structure/tree and a cool root run in a reasonable soil.

It occurs throughout the North Island and in parts of the South Island as far south as Banks Peninsula.
