= Mount Herbert (Canterbury) =

Summit in New Zealand

Mount Herbert / Te Ahu Pātiki
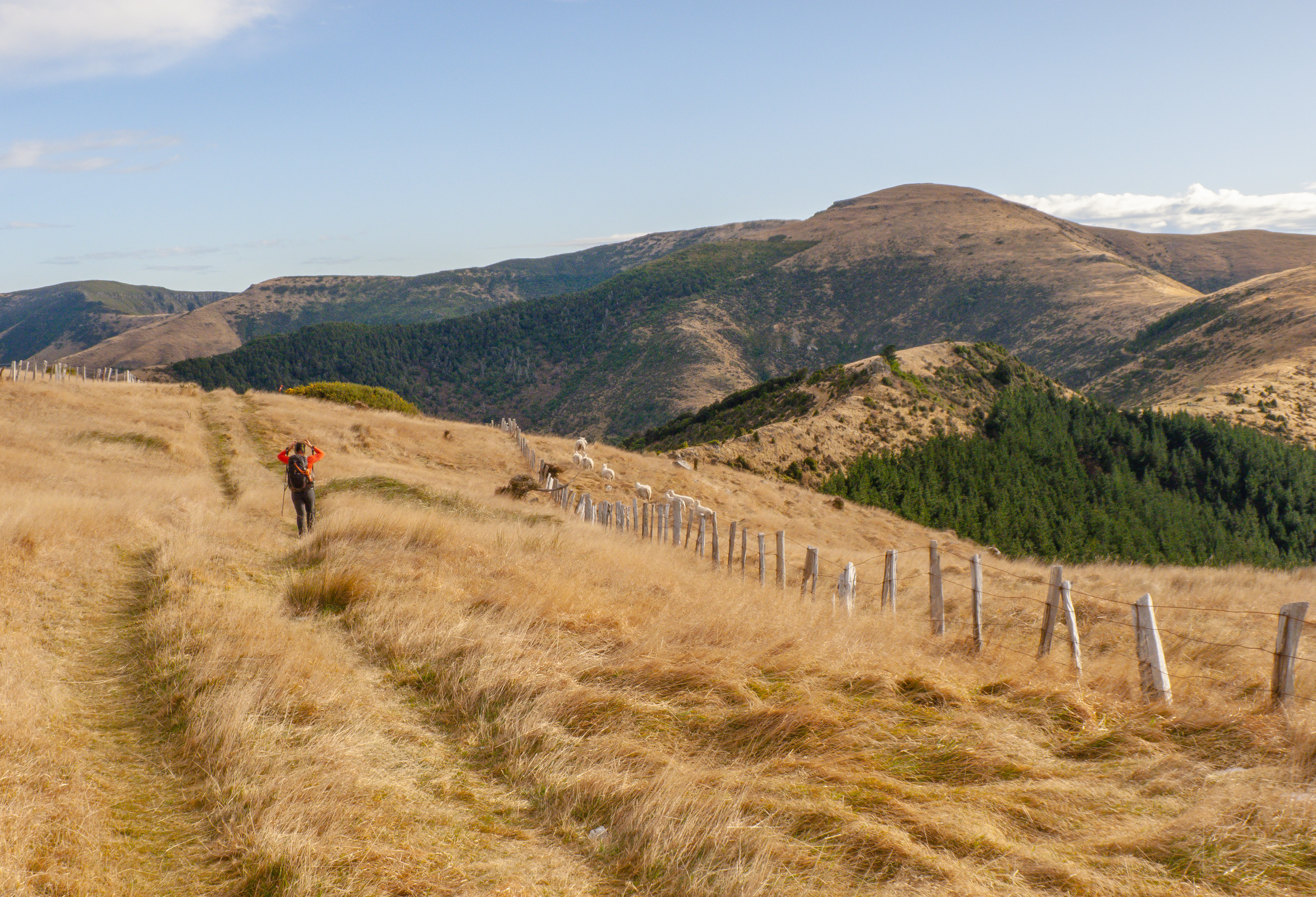
- Mount Herbert / Te Ahu Pātiki as viewed from Te Ara Pātaka

Highest point
- Elevation: 919 m (3,015 ft)
- Prominence: 905 m (2,969 ft)
- Coordinates: 43.689590°S 172.741960°E

Naming
- Etymology: Named for Sidney Herbert, a member of the Canterbury Association, and Te Ahu Pātiki, a passenger on the Āraiteuru waka
- Native name: Te Ahu Pātiki (Māori)

Geography
- Location within Banks Peninsula Location within New Zealand
- Country: New Zealand
- Region: Canterbury
- Territorial local authority: Christchurch City

Geology
- Formed by: Volcanic eruption, erosion
- Rock age: Late Miocene
- Rock type: Basalt
- Last eruption: c. 5mya

Mount Herbert / Te Ahu Pātiki is, at 919 metres (3,015 ft), the highest peak on Banks Peninsula, New Zealand. It is south of Lyttelton Harbour with the township of Diamond Harbour at its northern foot.

The peak takes its name from prominent European and Māori figures. Originally known as Te Ahu Pātiki in honour of a Māori ancestor who came to the region on board the Āraiteuru waka who is said to have turned to stone after failing to return to the waka by daylight, Pākehā settlers to the area renamed the peak after Sidney Herbert, a member of the Canterbury Association. In 1998, these two names were combined to give the peak its current dual name by the Ngāi Tahu Claims Settlement Act 1998.

In the 1860s, the mountain gave its name to a general electorate for some years. In the 1865 electoral redistribution, the Mount Herbert electorate was formed; it was first used in the 1866 election. In the 1870 electoral redistribution, the electorate was abolished.

In 2021, a 500 ha (1,200 acres) property covering the mountain and nearby Mount Bradley was purchased by the Rod Donald Trust after a successful crowdfunding campaign and support from the Christchurch newspaper The Press. The purchase returned Mount Herbert / Te Ahu Pātiki to public ownership under a charitable trust model in conjunction with local iwi and began a process of forest regeneration in the area. The peak is increasingly accessible to the public since the purchase, with tracks for walking and mountain biking being established and connected to existing tracks in Orton Bradley Park and elsewhere on the peninsula. This includes the establishment of Te Ara Pātaka, a 35-kilometre-long (22 mi) track across much of central Banks Peninsula.

== Climate ==
According to the Köppen Climate Classification, Mount Herbert is a dry subpolar oceanic climate, with slightly more precipitation in the winter than in the summer.

Climate data for Mount Herbert 43.69°S 172.74°E, 889m
Month	Jan	Feb	Mar	Apr	May	Jun	Jul	Aug	Sep	Oct	Nov	Dec	Year
Mean maximum °C (°F)	25 (77)	25 (77)	22 (72)	19 (66)	15 (59)	13 (55)	11 (52)	12 (54)	15 (59)	17 (63)	20 (68)	23 (73)	25 (77)
Mean daily maximum °C (°F)	17 (63)	17 (63)	15 (59)	12 (54)	9 (48)	6 (43)	5 (41)	6 (43)	9 (48)	11 (52)	13 (55)	16 (61)	11 (53)
Daily mean °C (°F)	11 (52)	11 (52)	9 (48)	6.5 (43.7)	4 (39)	1.5 (34.7)	1 (34)	1.5 (34.7)	3 (37)	5 (41)	6.5 (43.7)	9.5 (49.1)	5.8 (42.4)
Mean daily minimum °C (°F)	5 (41)	5 (41)	3 (37)	1 (34)	−1 (30)	−3 (27)	−3 (27)	−3 (27)	−3 (27)	−1 (30)	0 (32)	3 (37)	0 (33)
Mean minimum °C (°F)	−1 (30)	−1 (30)	−4 (25)	−6 (21)	−7 (19)	−8 (18)	−8 (18)	−8 (18)	−9 (16)	−8 (18)	−7 (19)	−3 (27)	−9 (16)
Average precipitation mm (inches)	33 (1.3)	37 (1.5)	39 (1.5)	35 (1.4)	53 (2.1)	48 (1.9)	56 (2.2)	53 (2.1)	39 (1.5)	47 (1.9)	43 (1.7)	42 (1.7)	525 (20.8)
Average precipitation days	8.8	8.1	8.2	7.8	9.3	9.7	9.9	10.5	8.5	10.5	9.7	10.5	111.5
Source: Meteoblue
