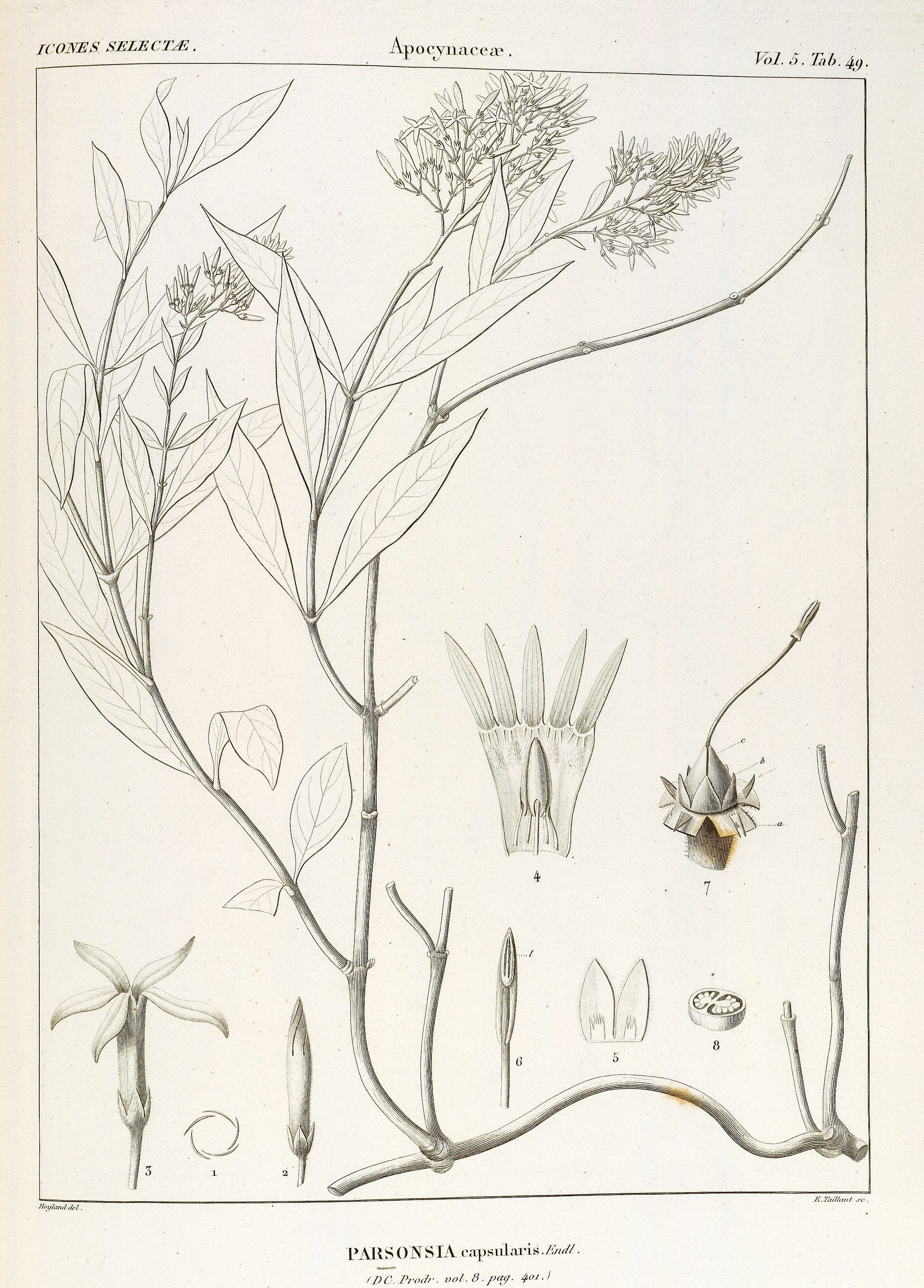
- Icones selectae plantarum, vol. 5: t. 49 (1846) artist: J.C. Heyland
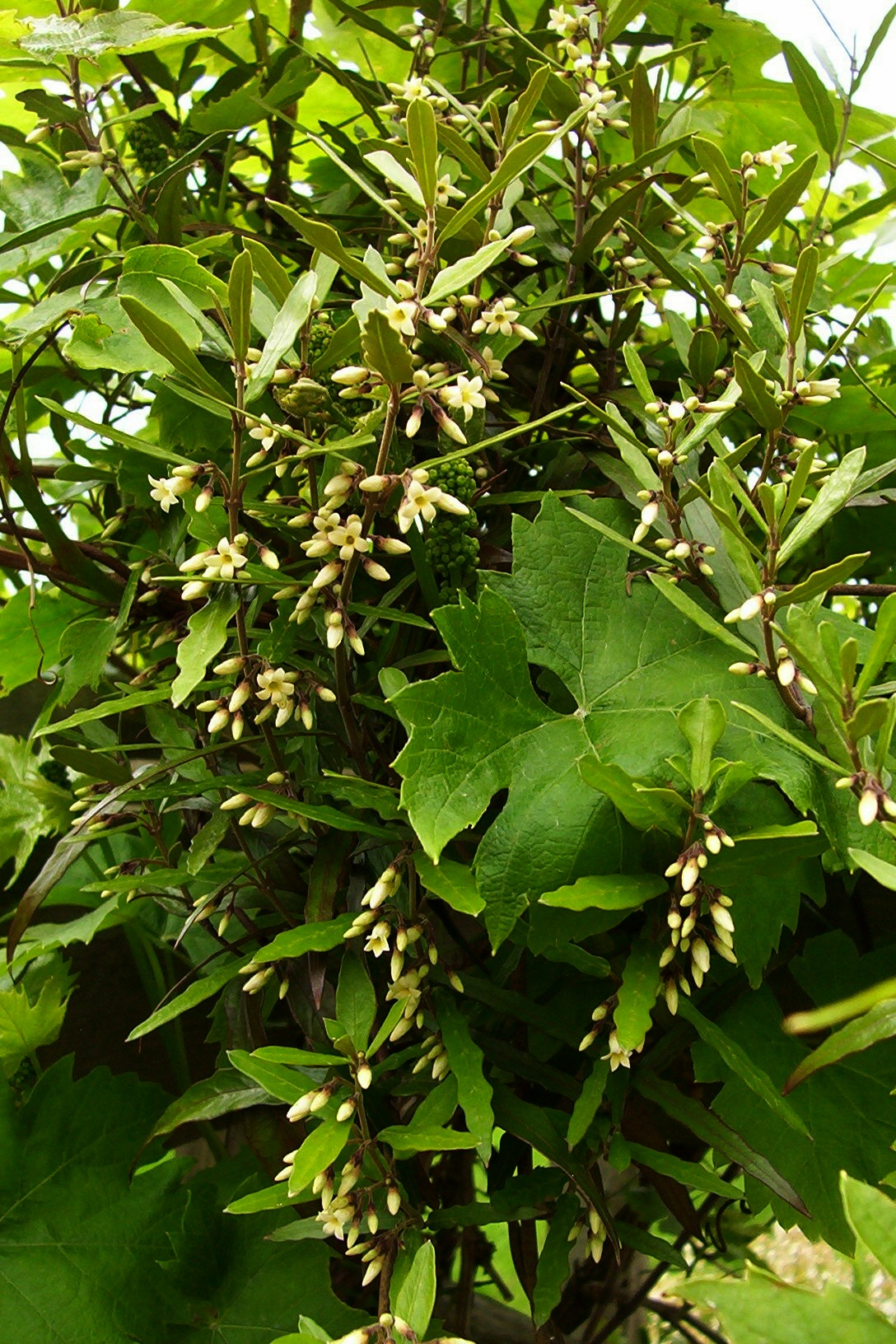
- Parsonsia capsularis

Scientific classification
- Kingdom: Plantae
- Clade: Tracheophytes
- Clade: Angiosperms
- Clade: Eudicots
- Clade: Asterids
- Order: Gentianales
- Family: Apocynaceae
- Genus: Parsonsia
- Species: P. capsularis

Binomial name
- Parsonsia capsularis (G.Forst.) R.Br.
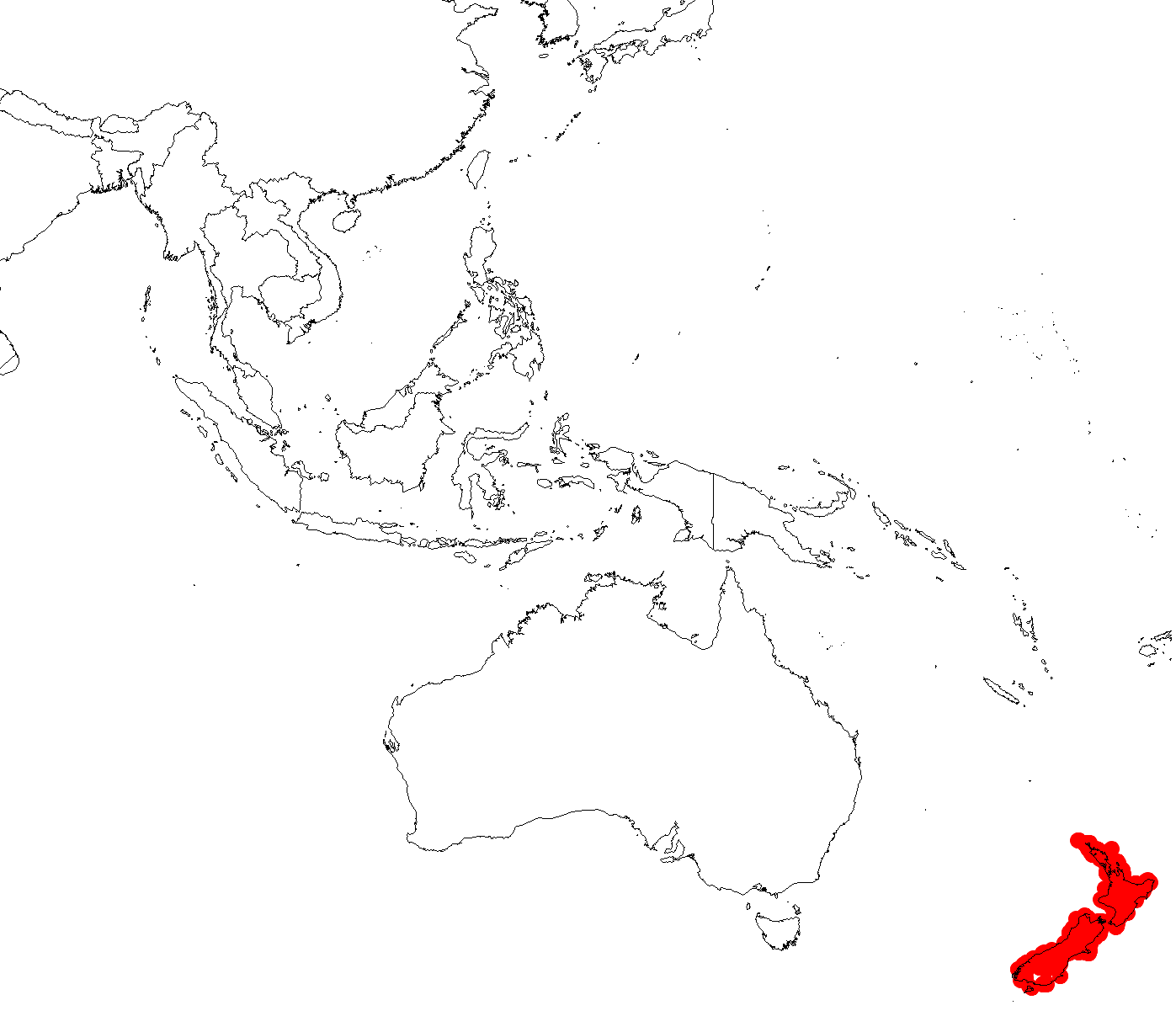
- Occurrence data from GBIF

= Parsonsia capsularis =

Species of flowering plant

Parsonsia capsularis is a climbing plant endemic to New Zealand belonging to the dogbane family Apocynaceae.

The common names for the plant are New Zealand jasmine or small flowered jasmine, and in Māori it has several names including: akakaikiore, akakiore, kaikū, kaikūkū, kaiwhiria, tōtoroene and tōtorowene.

Despite its common name, the species is not a "true jasmine" and not of the genus Jasminum.

== Taxonomy ==
Parsonsia capsularis was first named and described as Periploca capsularis by Georg Forster in 1786 and in 1809 was assigned by Robert Brown to his newly described genus, Parsonsia.

== Etymology ==
The specific epithet, capsularis. derives from the Latin, capsula (small box - capsule) and means bearing capsules, producing capsules, or capsular-fruited.

== See also ==
- Flora of New Zealand
