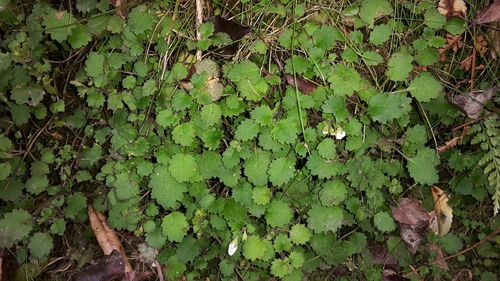

Scientific classification
- Kingdom: Plantae
- Clade: Tracheophytes
- Clade: Angiosperms
- Clade: Eudicots
- Clade: Asterids
- Order: Lamiales
- Family: Calceolariaceae
- Genus: Jovellana
- Species: J. repens

Binomial name
- Jovellana repens (Hook.f.) Kraenzl.
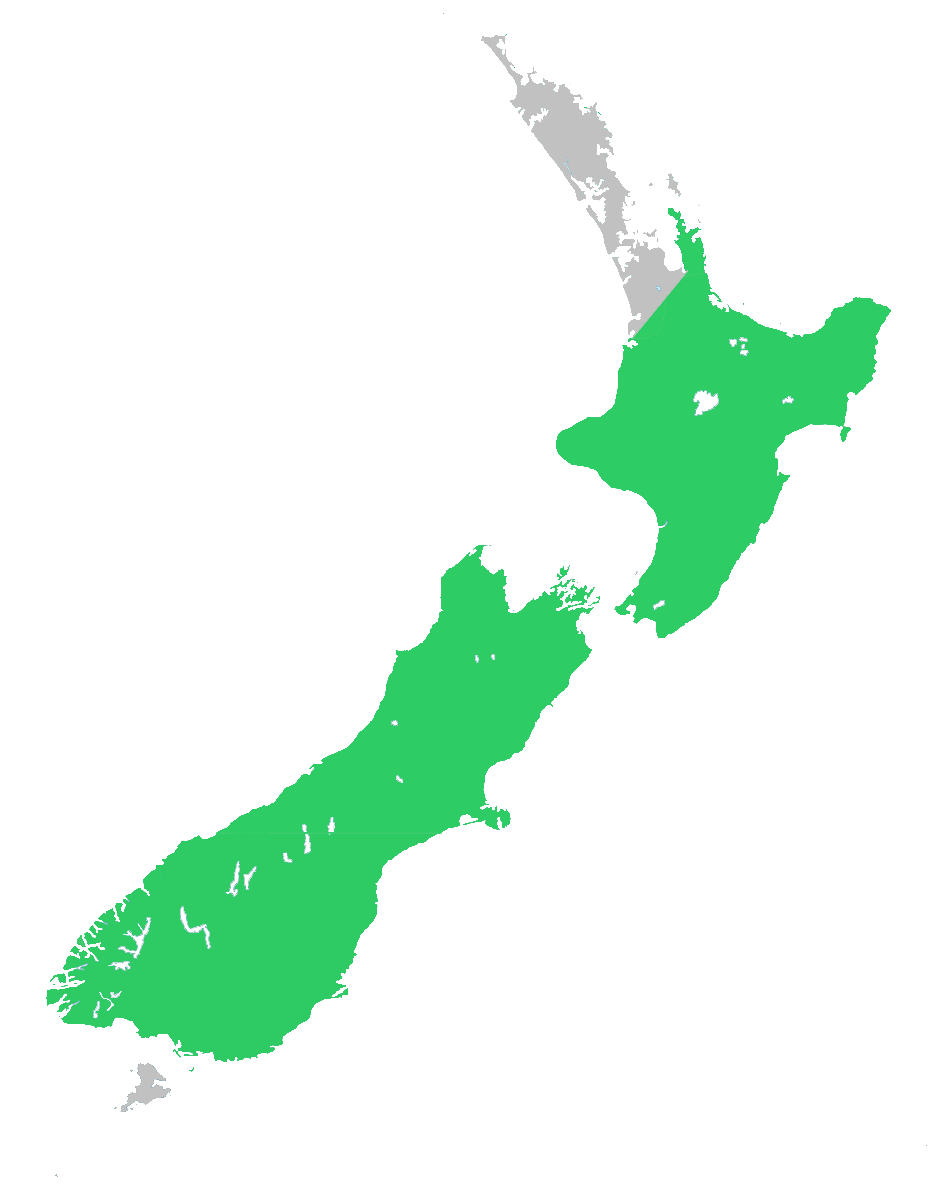
- Estimated range

Synonyms
- Calceolaria repens Hook.f.

= Jovellana repens =

Species of flowering plant

Jovellana repens is an endemic New Zealand plant in the family Calceolariaceae spread through both the North and South Islands. It has small green leaves and white flowers with spots of purple on the inside.

== Description ==
Jovellana repens is a perennial herbaceous plant which grows into a mat 1–2 m in diameter. It has 2–3 cm long dark red or green stems with 1–4 cm long leaves suspended from 5–12 by 2–2.3 mm hairy petioles. The leaves are dark green to reddish green above and pale green to light red below.

It has inflorescences with one to five, usually two to three, flowers partially obscured by the foliage, with nude pedicels. The flowers are 6 mm in diameter and have 1–2 mm long sepals. They are white with small purple spots on the inside and have two concave lips.

It fruits from October to February, producing a 0.35–0.5 mm long dark red-brown seed concealed inside ovoid (egg-shaped) 6–7 mm seed capsules. They are dispersed by wind but also possibly by water.

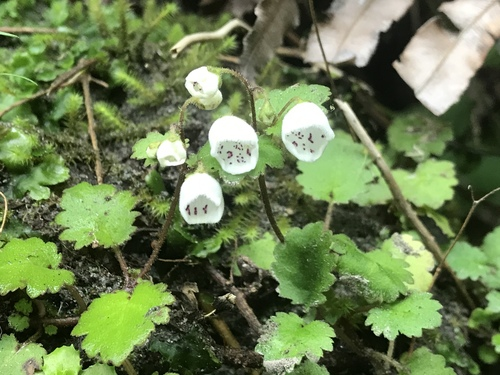
Flowers

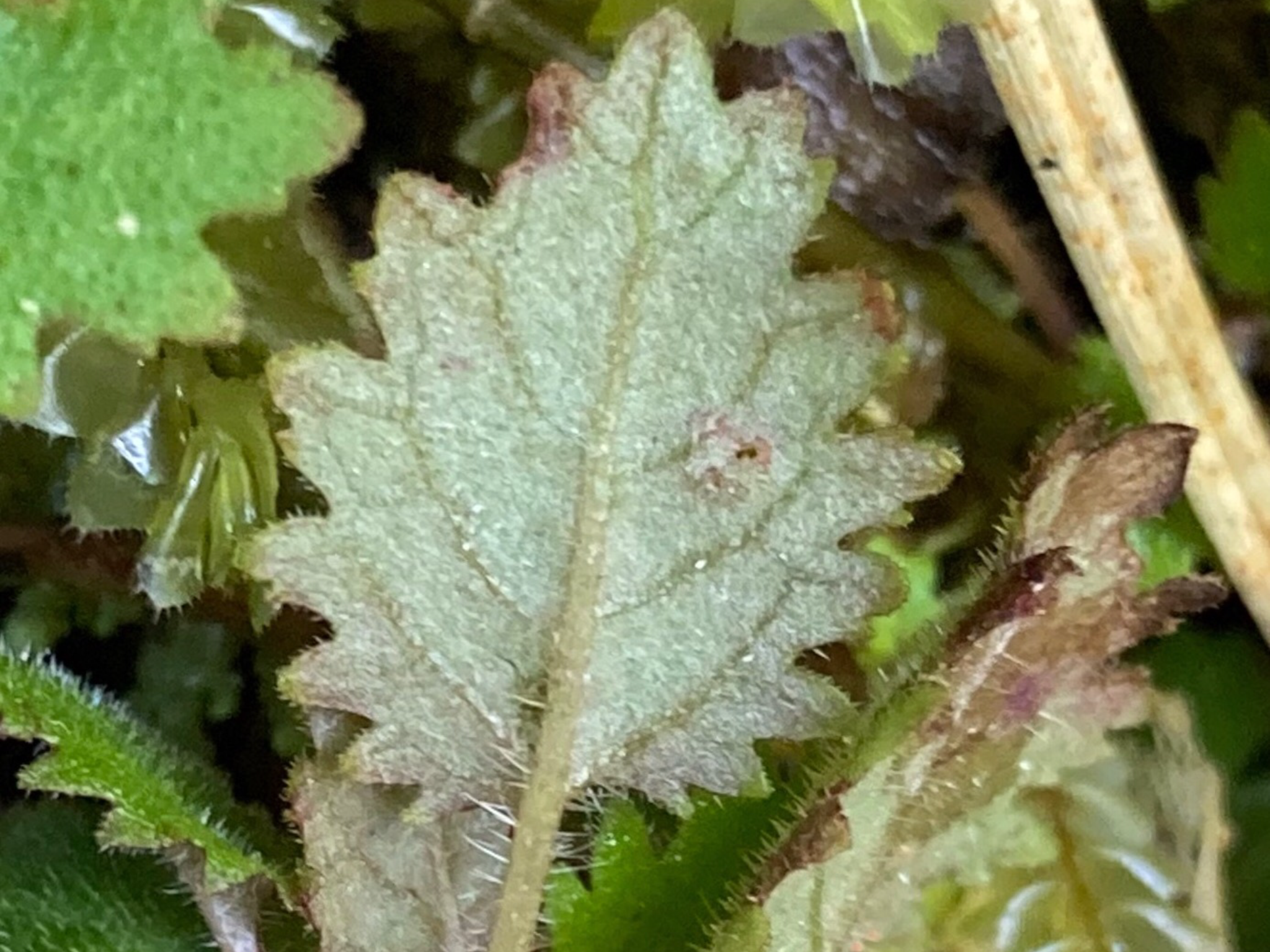
Leaf Underside

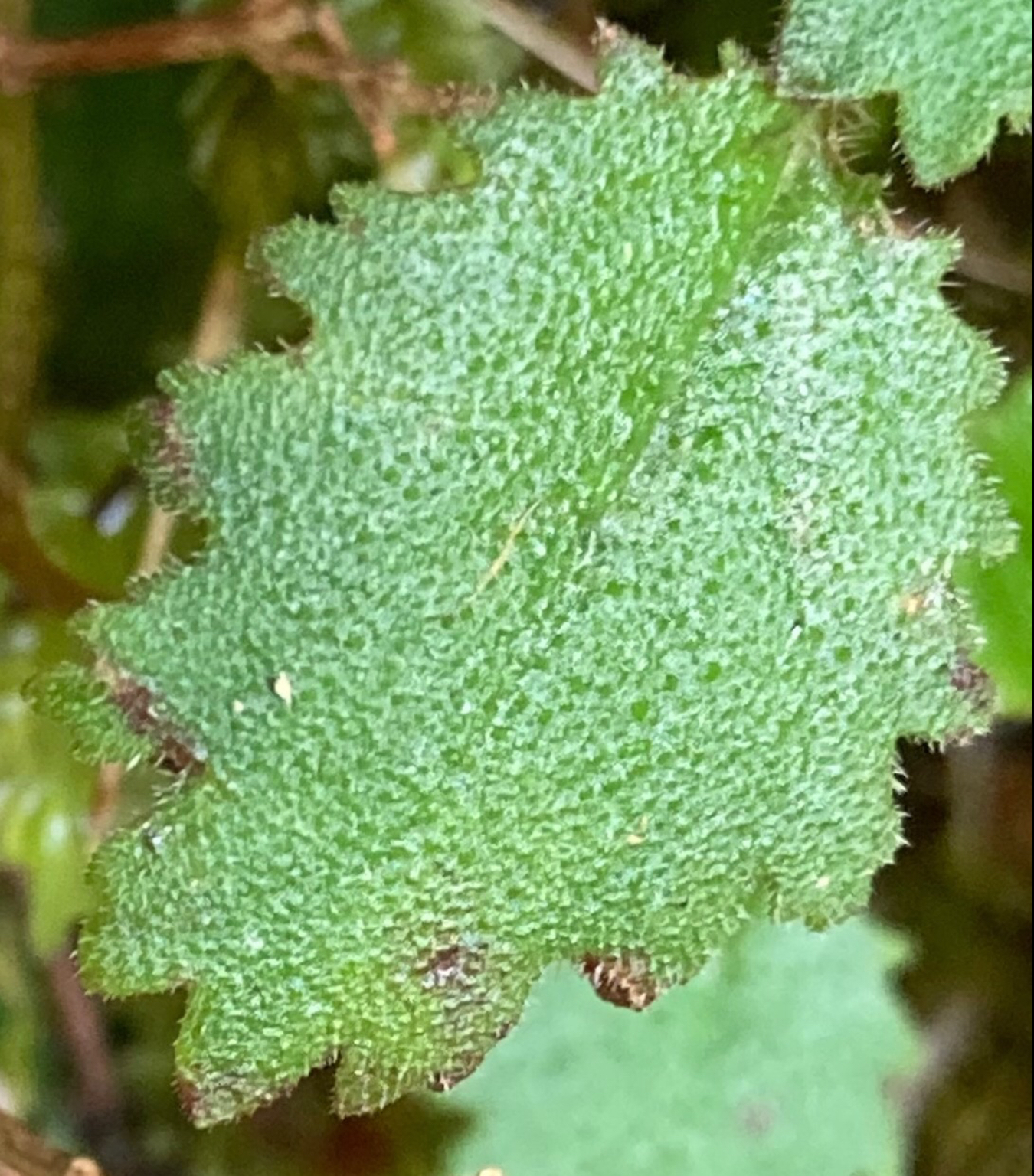
Top side of leaf

== Etymology ==
Jovellana honours the 18th century patron of botany Gaspar Melchor de Jovellanos and repens is from the Latin repere meaning to creep, which describes the way in which it grows.

== Distribution and habitat ==
Jovellana repens grows in both the North and South Islands of New Zealand from Mt Pirongia and Te Moehau in the east and west, south. It grows in shady spots on the sides of streams but also on banks and cliffs in lowland to montane forest.

== Identification ==
Jovellana repens is very similar to Jovellana sinclairii but can be distinguished by the way it grows; creeping as opposed to the small shrubs which Jovellana sinclairii grows into. It also has smaller leaves and flowers, and inflorescences with fewer flowers in them (usually two to three in each). It is also similar to Brachyglottis sciadophila but, whereas Jovellana repens creeps, Brachyglottis sciadophila grows lianoid (like a woody vine) and has long rarely branching stems. When in flower, it is, however, very obvious as Brachyglottis sciadophila has bright yellow flowers. It can also be confused with Veronica jovellanoides but it has circular, spatular-shaped leaves with inflorescences that have one to seven non-pouched flowers and a magenta corolla.

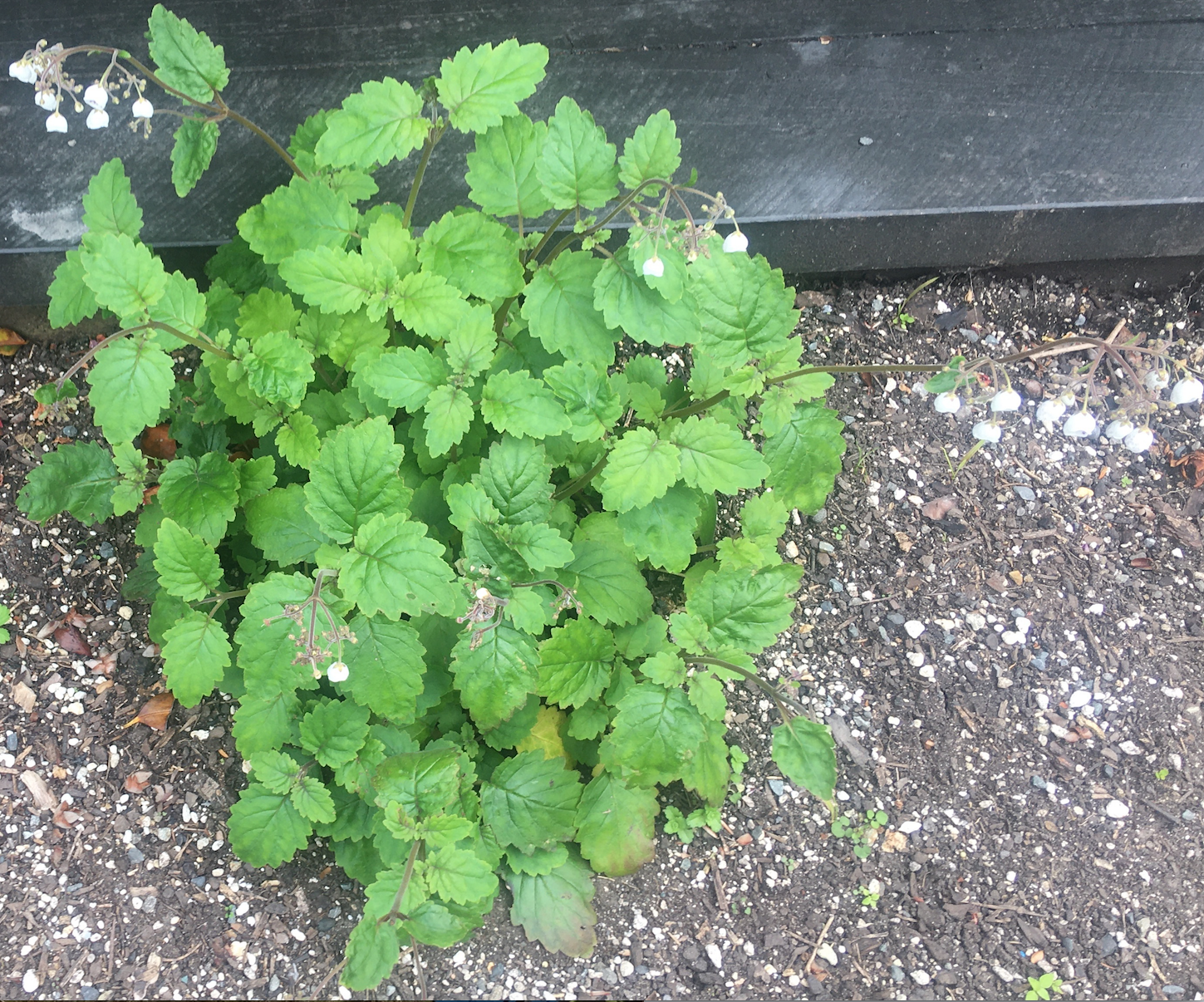
Jovellana sinclairii

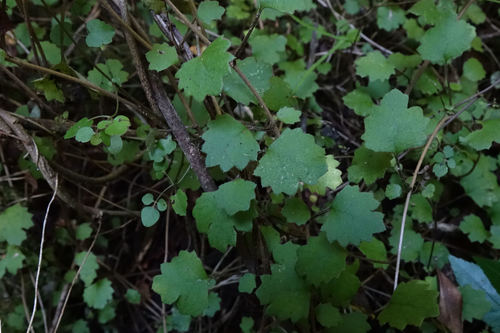
Brachyglottis sciadophila

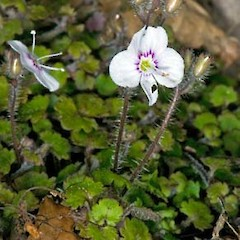
Veronica jovellanoides
