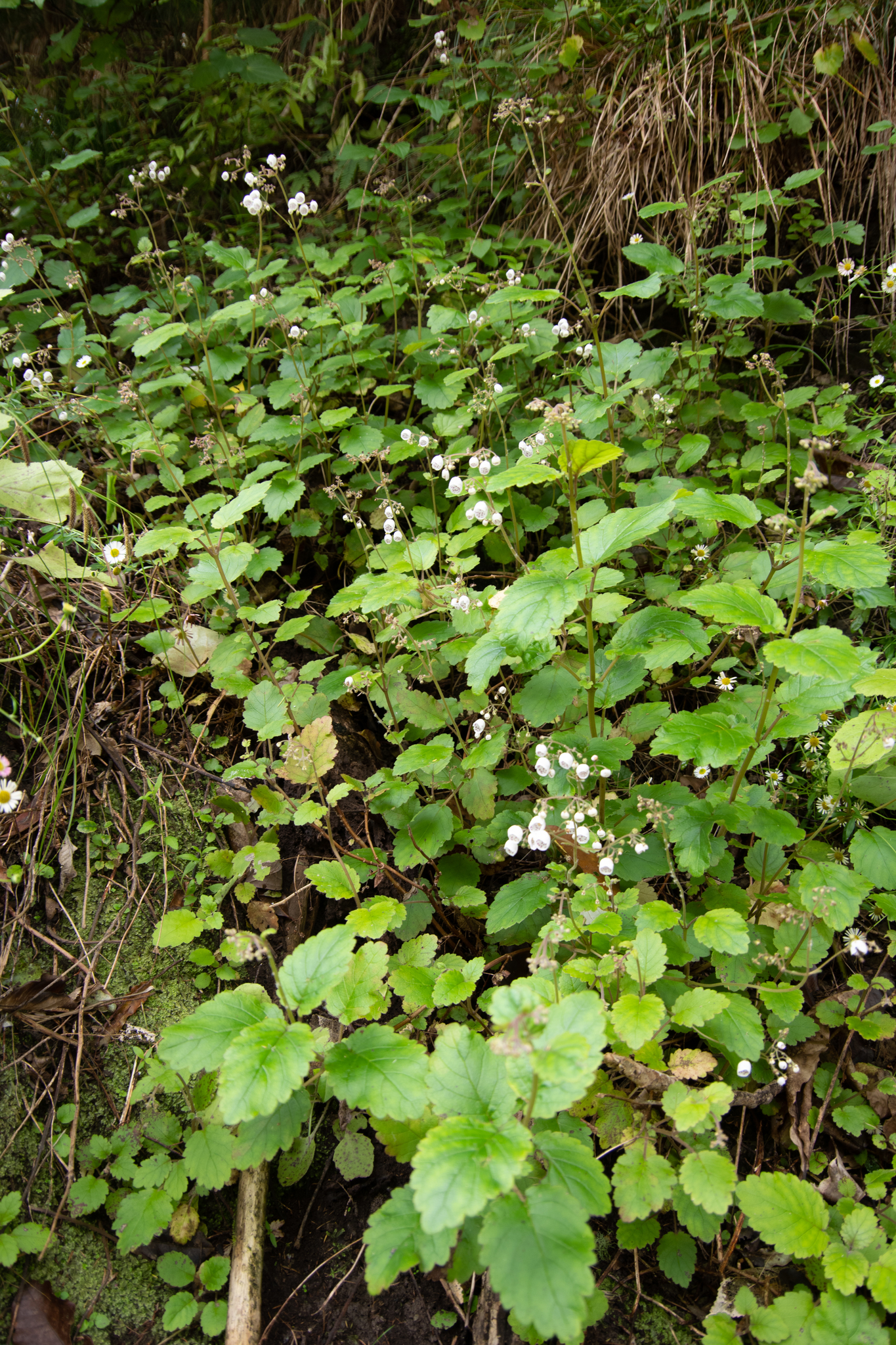

Conservation status
- Declining (NZ TCS)

Scientific classification
- Kingdom: Plantae
- Clade: Tracheophytes
- Clade: Angiosperms
- Clade: Eudicots
- Clade: Asterids
- Order: Lamiales
- Family: Calceolariaceae
- Genus: Jovellana
- Species: J. sinclairii

Binomial name
- Jovellana sinclairii (Hook.) Kraenzl.
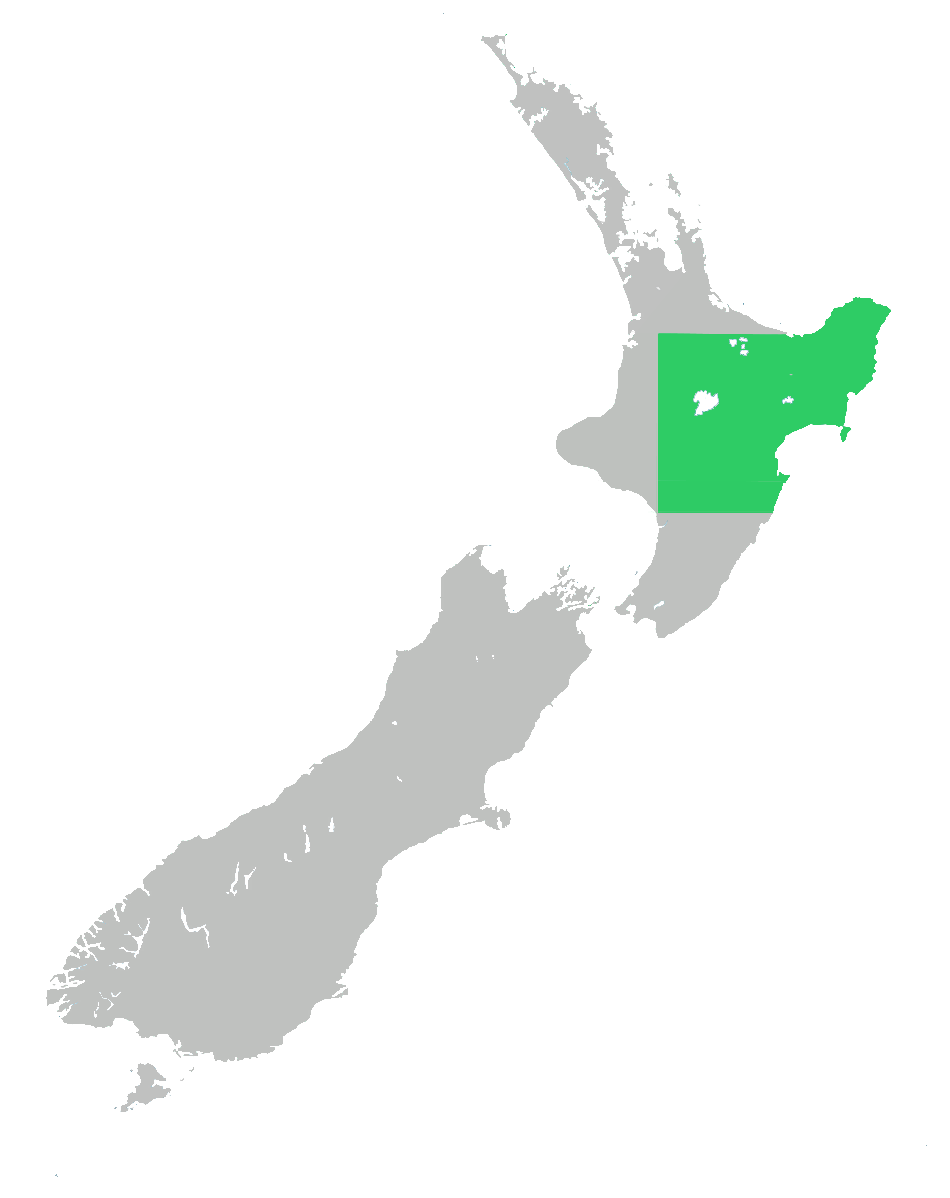
- Estimated range

Synonyms
- Calceolaria albula Colenso; Calceolaria sinclairii Hook.; Calceolaria sturmii Colenso; Fagelia sinclairii (Hook.) Kuntze; Jovellana albula (Colenso) Kraenzl.; Jovellana sturmii (Colenso) Kraenzl.

= Jovellana sinclairii =

Species of plant

Jovellana sinclairii, commonly known as the New Zealand calceolaria, is an endemic New Zealand shrub found in eastern and central North Island forests. In the family Calceolariaceae, it has white, bell shaped flowers with spots of purple on the inside.

== Description ==
Jovellana sinclairii is a perennial herbaceous plant which grows into 1 by 1.8 m rounded shrubs. The leaves are 2 - 8 cm by 2 - 5 cm and grow opposite each other, suspended off of 8.2 by 2.3 mm petioles. Above they are a dark to yellow green and light green below. The plant's stems can be up to 80 cm long and are green or red, the bases of which becoming woody with age. It has 30cm long inflorescences with cream white flowers growing off of 3cm long pedicels. The flowers are 4.8 - 10.2 mm long and have spots of purple with 2 concave lips and a 2 mm long calyx. The anthers are suborbicular (approximately circular) with short filaments. The seeds are 0.35 - 0.6 mm long and are dark red - brown concealed within an egg shaped 3.8. - 4.2 mm long capsule. It fruits from October to February and disperses its seeds by wind and possibly water.

Jovellana sinclairii looks similar to the other species in the genus Jovellana endemic to New Zealand; Jovellana repens, though it has smaller leaves, flowers, and typically fewer flowers in each inflorescence. It also grows into a mat as opposed to the small shrubs Jovellana sinclairii forms.

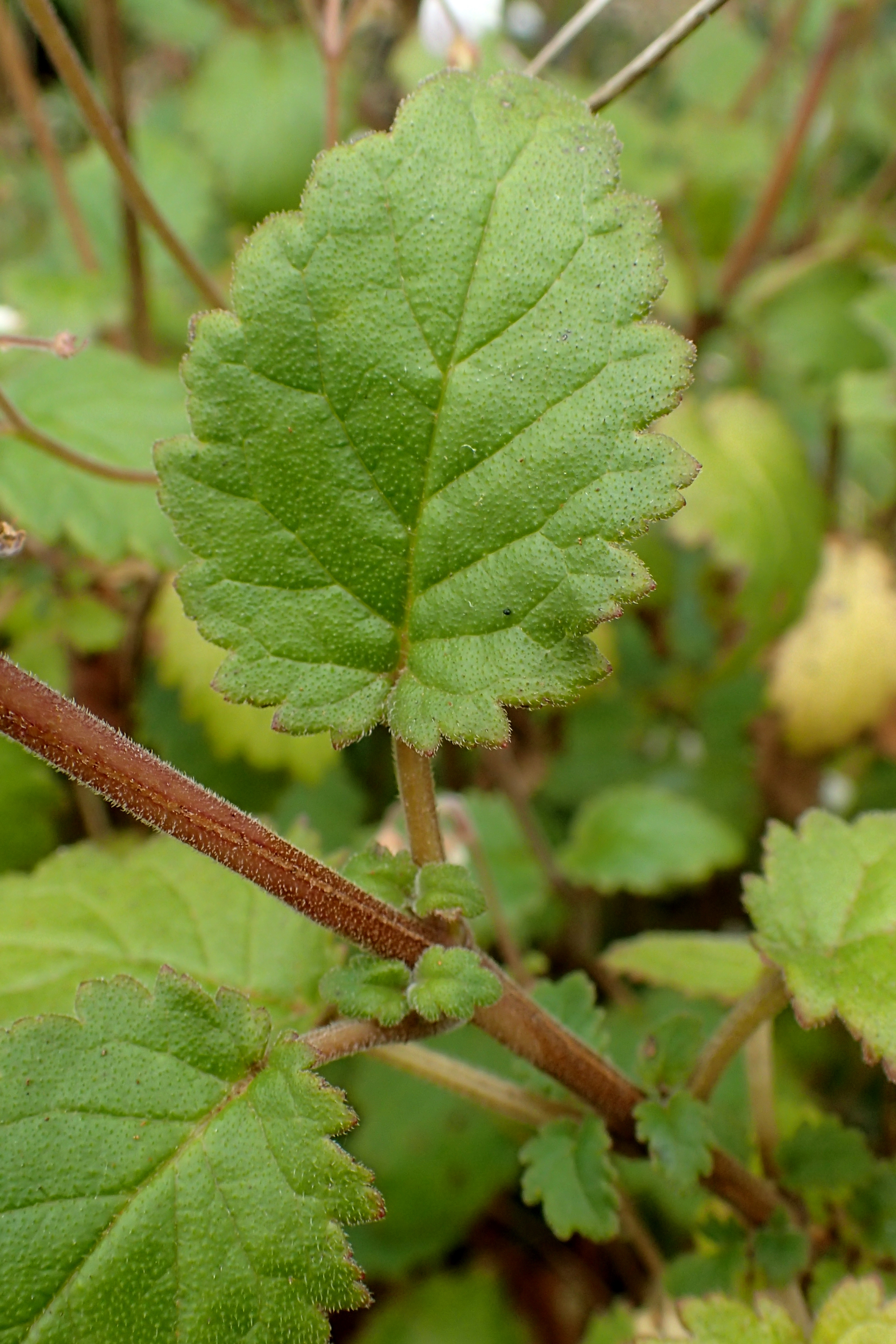
Top side of the leaf

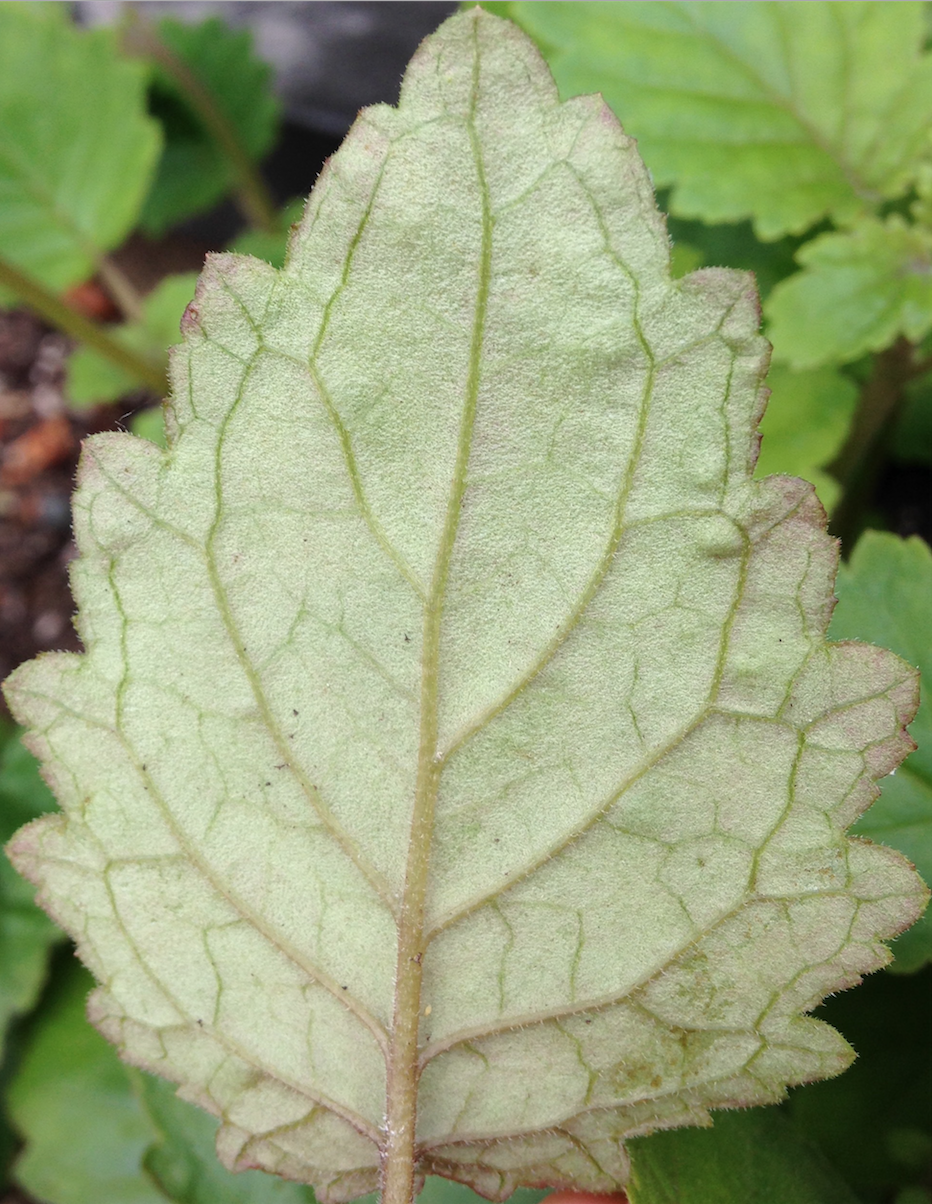
Underside of leaf

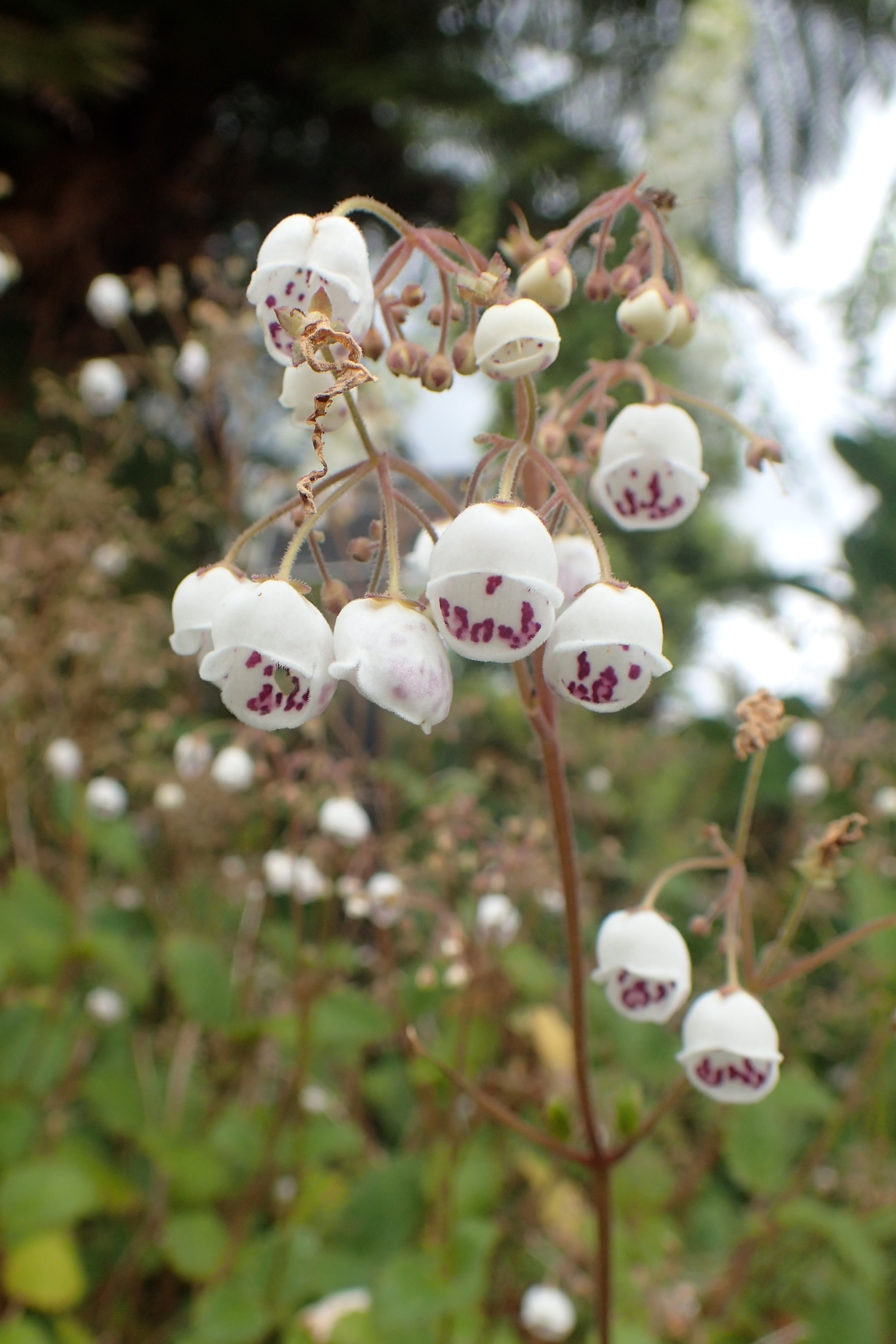
Full inflorescence

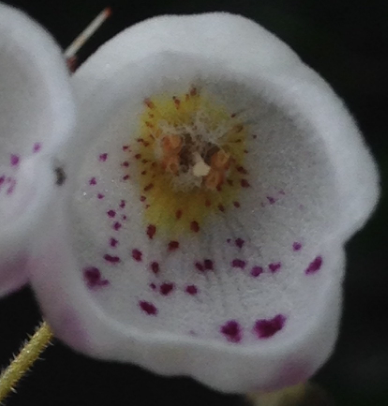
Flower close up

== Etymology ==
Jovellana honours the 18th century patron of Botany Gaspar Melchor de Jovellanos and sinclairii is after Andrew Sinclair, a Colonial Secretary of New Zealand and naturalist (c.1796 - 1861).

== Cultivation ==
It is easily grown from both seed and cuttings. Prefers a sheltered shady / semi-shady location in well drained soil.
