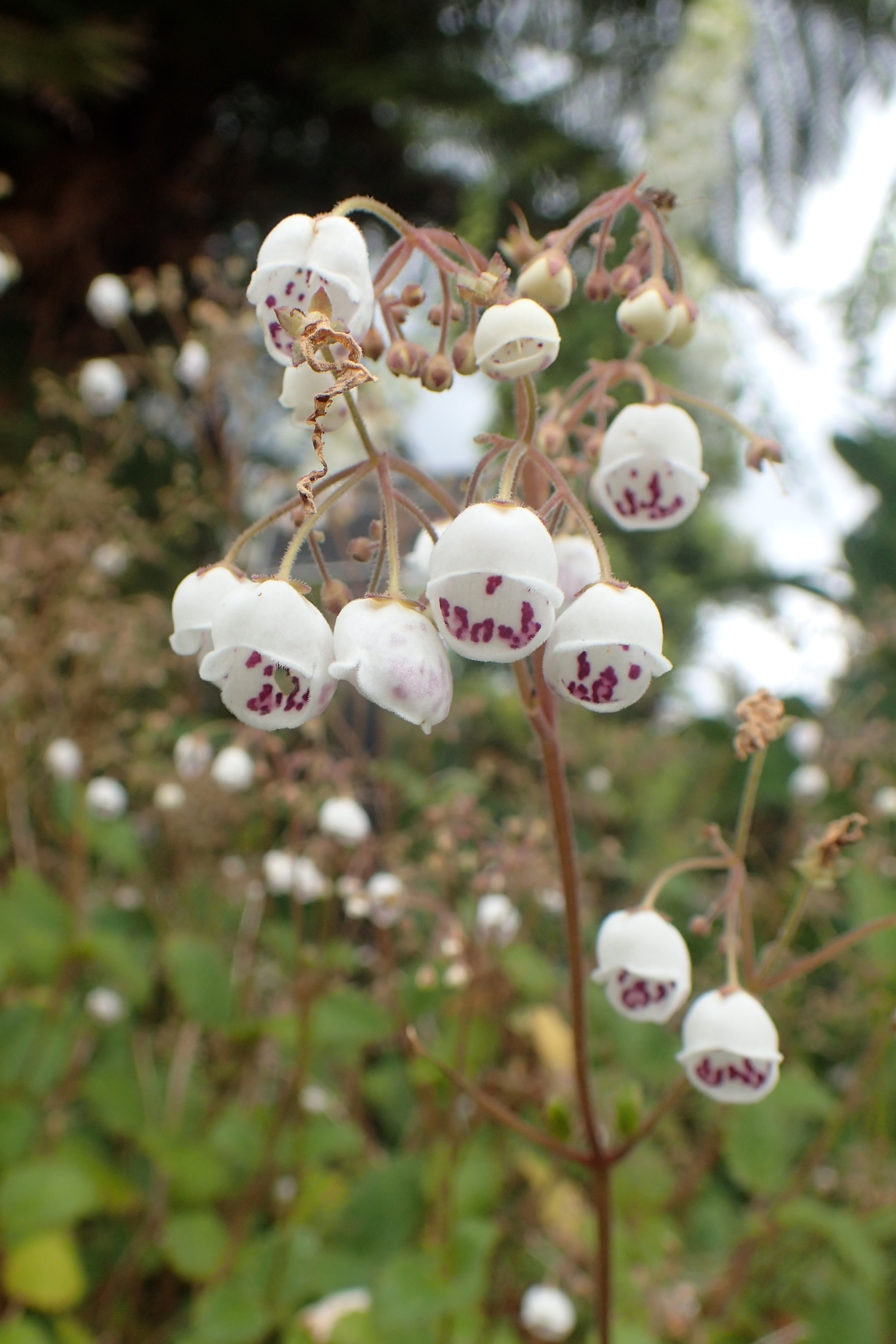
- Jovellana sinclairii, Auckland Botanic Gardens, New Zealand

Scientific classification
- Kingdom: Plantae
- Clade: Tracheophytes
- Clade: Angiosperms
- Clade: Eudicots
- Clade: Asterids
- Order: Lamiales
- Family: Calceolariaceae
- Genus: Jovellana; Ruiz & Pav.

= Jovellana =

Genus of flowering plants

Jovellana is a genus of flowering plants in the family Calceolariaceae. It was formerly included in Scrophulariaceae, and is still listed by some authorities as belonging there. However, recent molecular research indicates that the family Scrophulariaceae was polyphyletic, meaning that it contained more than one lineage with different parents. So several of its genera - including Jovellana - have been split off and assigned to new or existing families.

== History ==
During the Miocene epoch, the climate of the North Island of New Zealand was said to be subtropical. It started to cool down during the Late Miocene and Pliocene to a more temperate climate which was similar to that of central Chile. This may have allowed the South American elements of the Jovellana genus to establish their characteristics by long distance dispersal.

The South American and New Zealand clades are believed to have split 4.1 Ma and both New Zealand and South American species are believed to have diverged from one another about 1.0 Ma.

== Description ==
Jovellana currently contains four species of mainly herbaceous perennials native to Chile and New Zealand. They have simple leaves and, in summer, nodding sprays of single, two-lipped, bell-shaped flowers in shades of white, lilac and purple, heavily spotted with a contrasting colour inside.

== Species ==
Four species are currently accepted.

- Jovellana punctata (Chile)
- Jovellana repens (New Zealand)
- Jovellana sinclairii (New Zealand)
- Jovellana violacea (Chile)

== Distribution ==
Authorities have commented on the disjunct nature of the two populations in Chile and New Zealand. However, this is not unique. Fuchsia is another genus with species apparently randomly segregated between Central and South America, New Zealand and Tahiti.

== Cultivation ==
At least three species are cultivated as ornamental garden plants. They are frost-hardy down to −5 °C (23 °F), but in cultivation they require a sheltered position in full sun. Jovellana violacea, growing to 2.5 m (8.2 ft) tall by 1 m (3.3 ft) broad, is a semi-evergreen subshrub with lilac coloured flowers, internally spotted with purple on a yellow background. It has gained the Royal Horticultural Society's Award of Garden Merit.

== Gallery ==
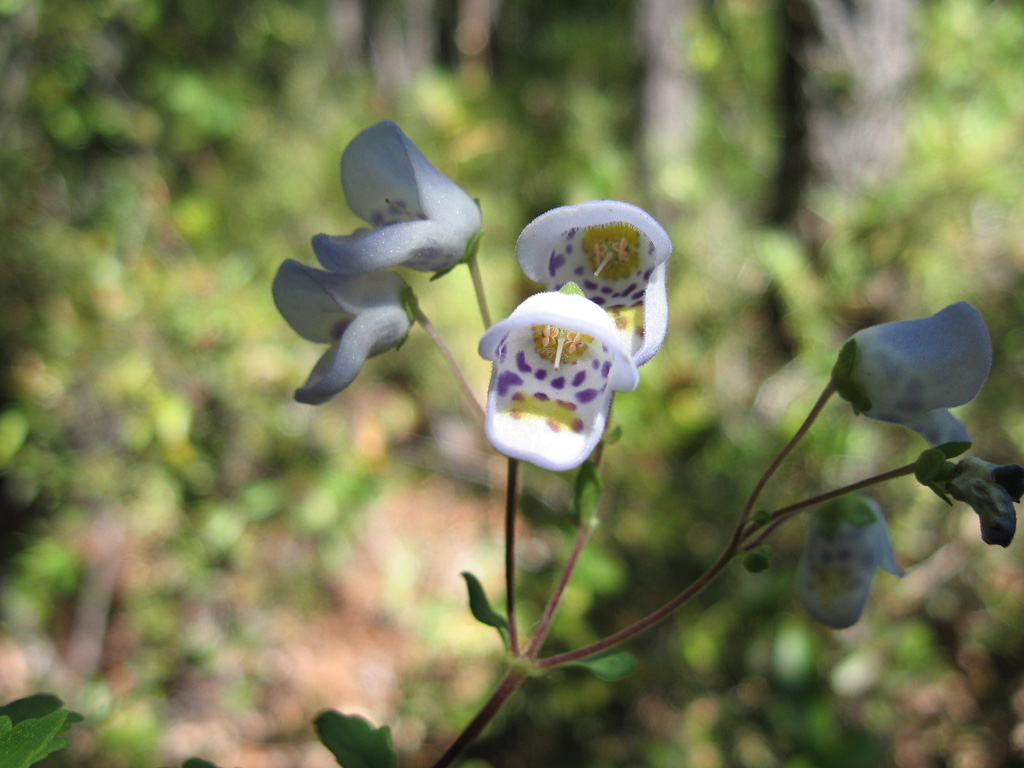
Jovellana punctata

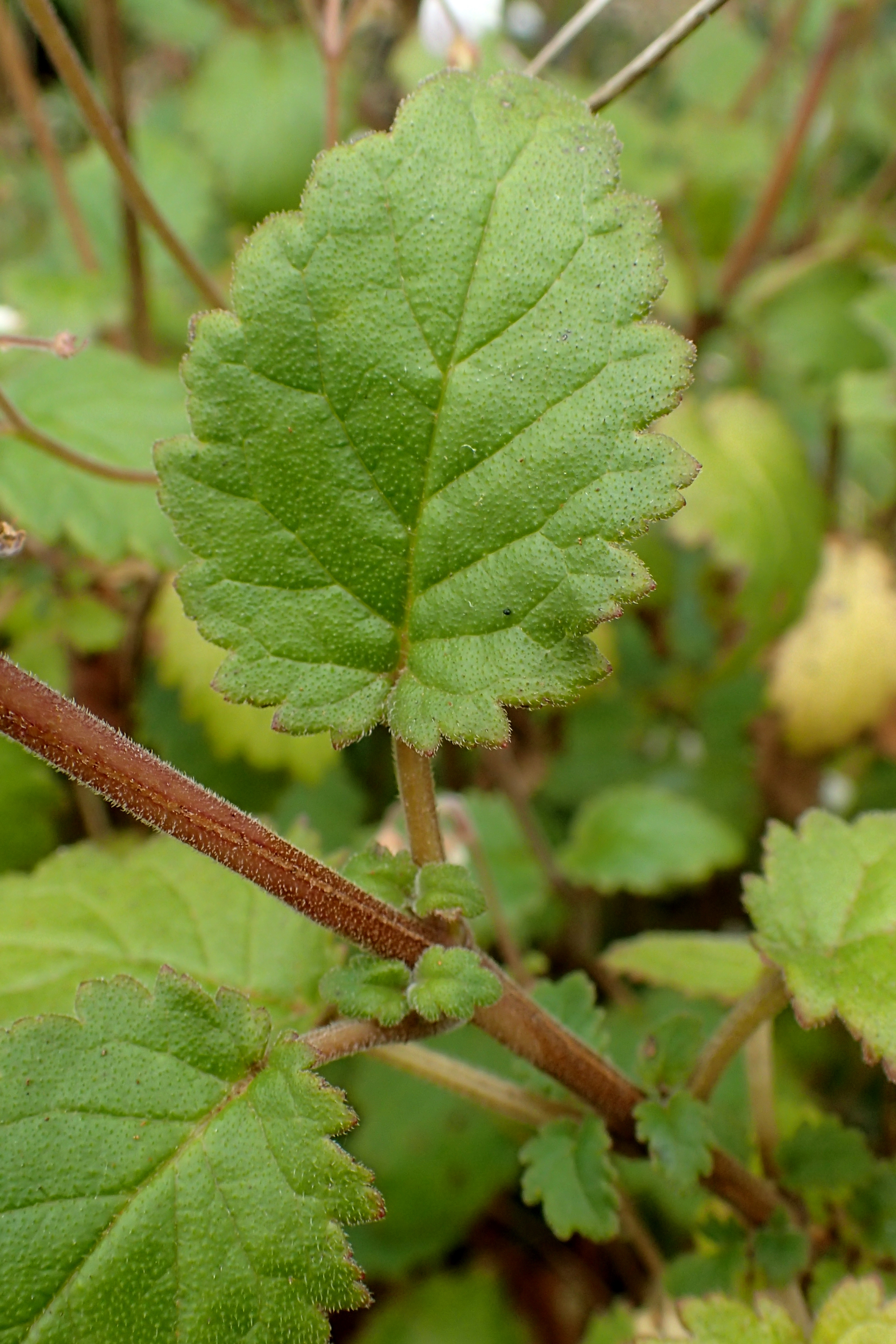
J. sinclairii - leaf

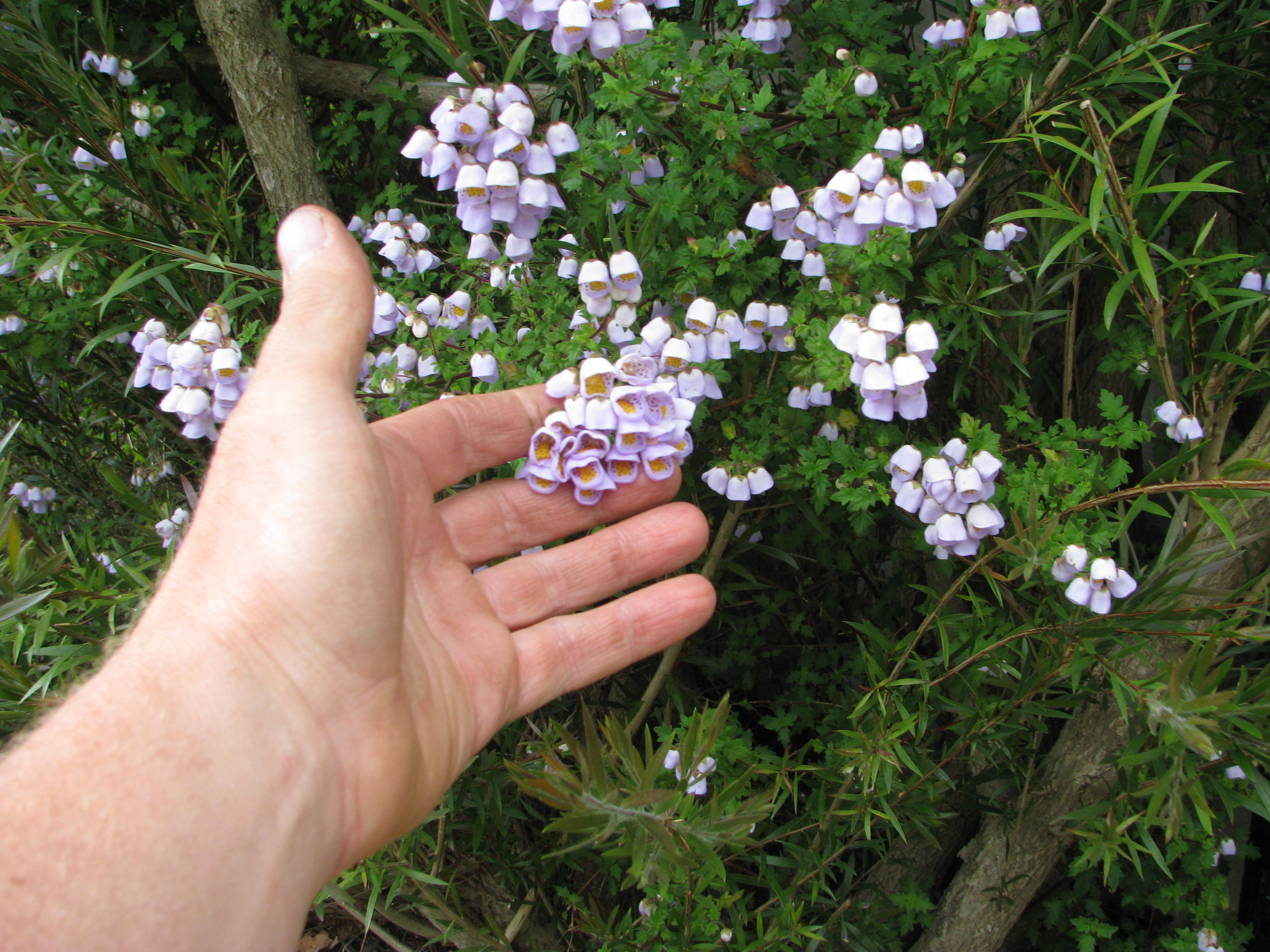
Jovellana violacea

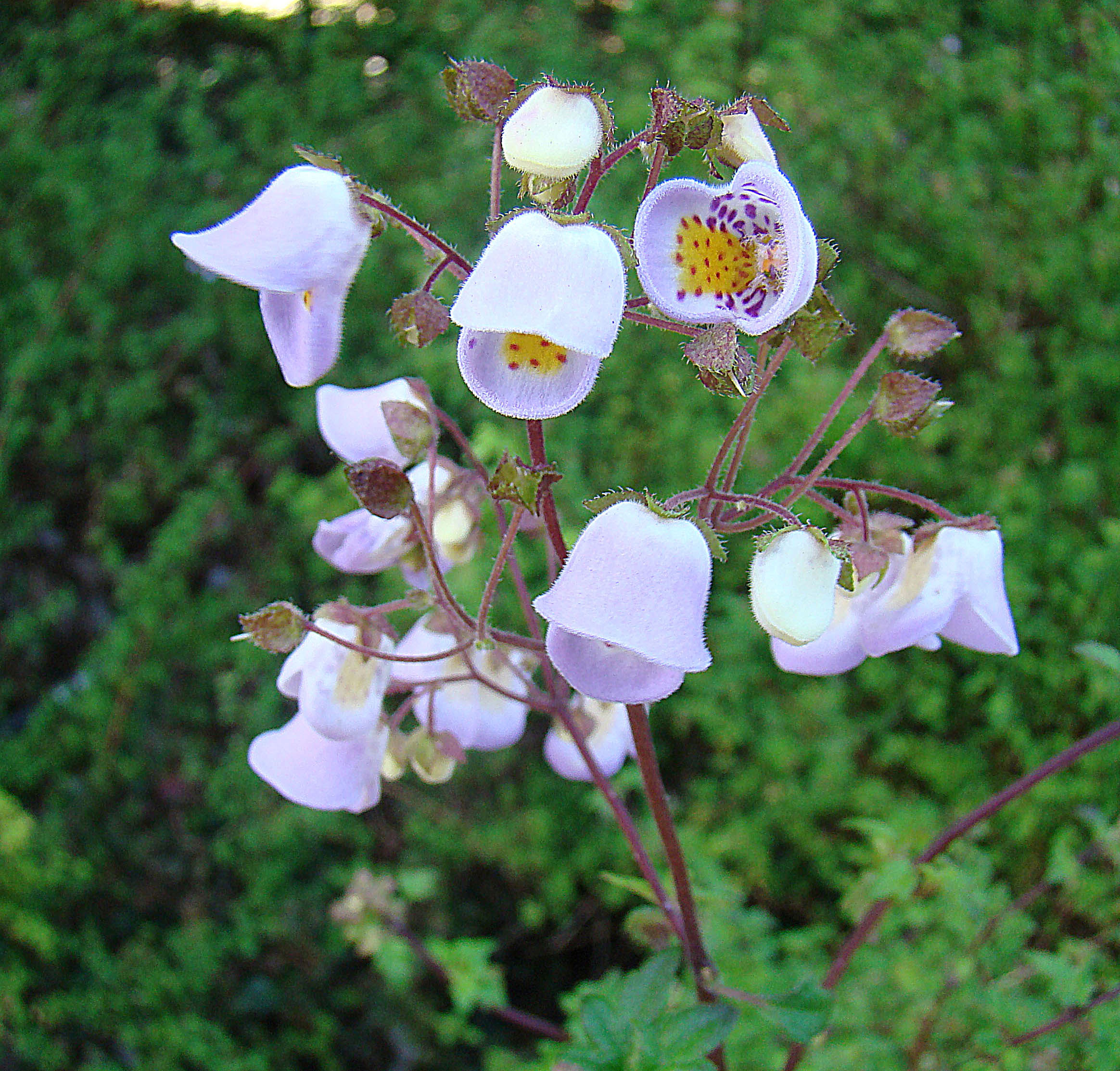
Jovellana violacea

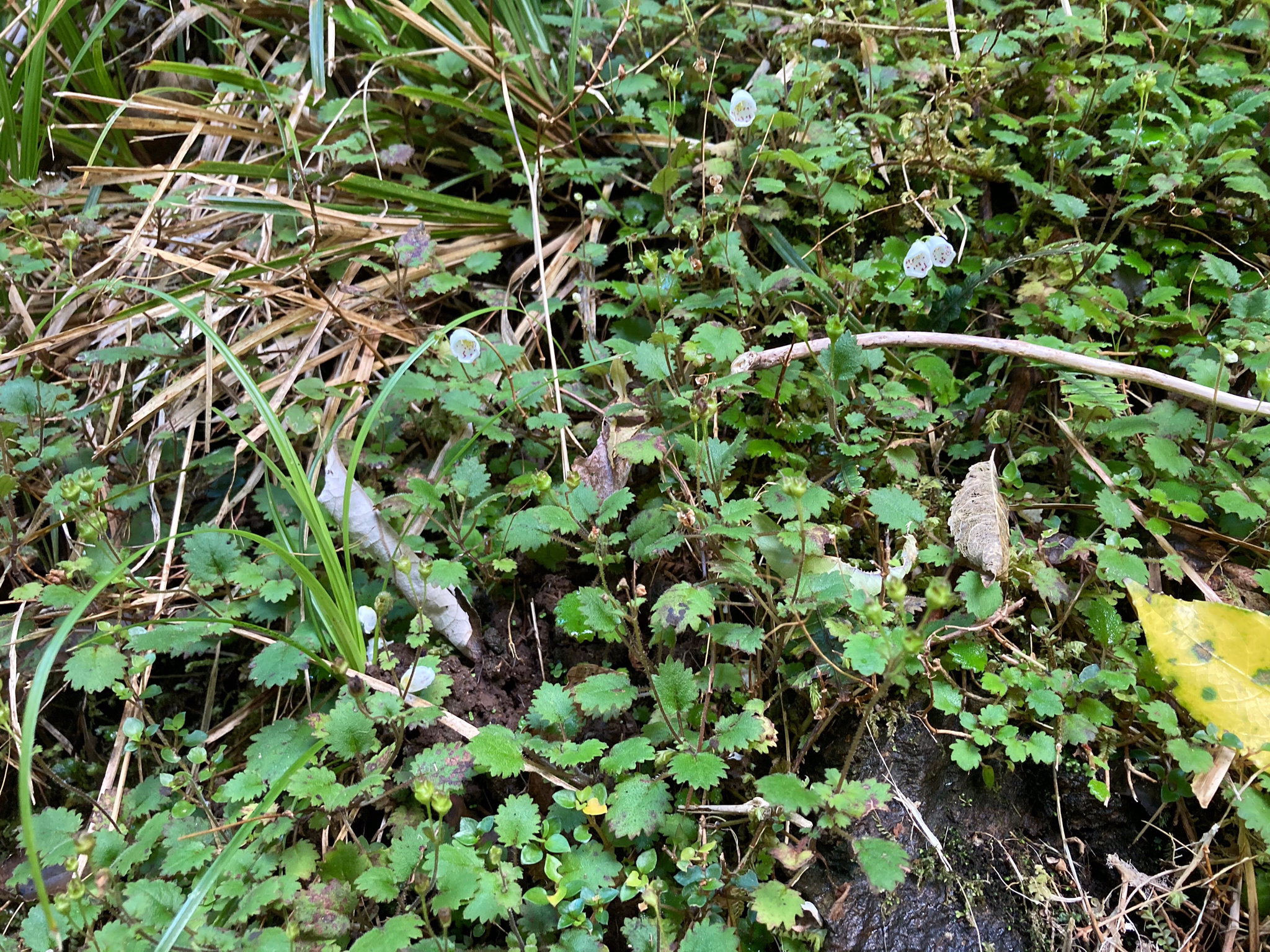
Jovellana repens's growth form
