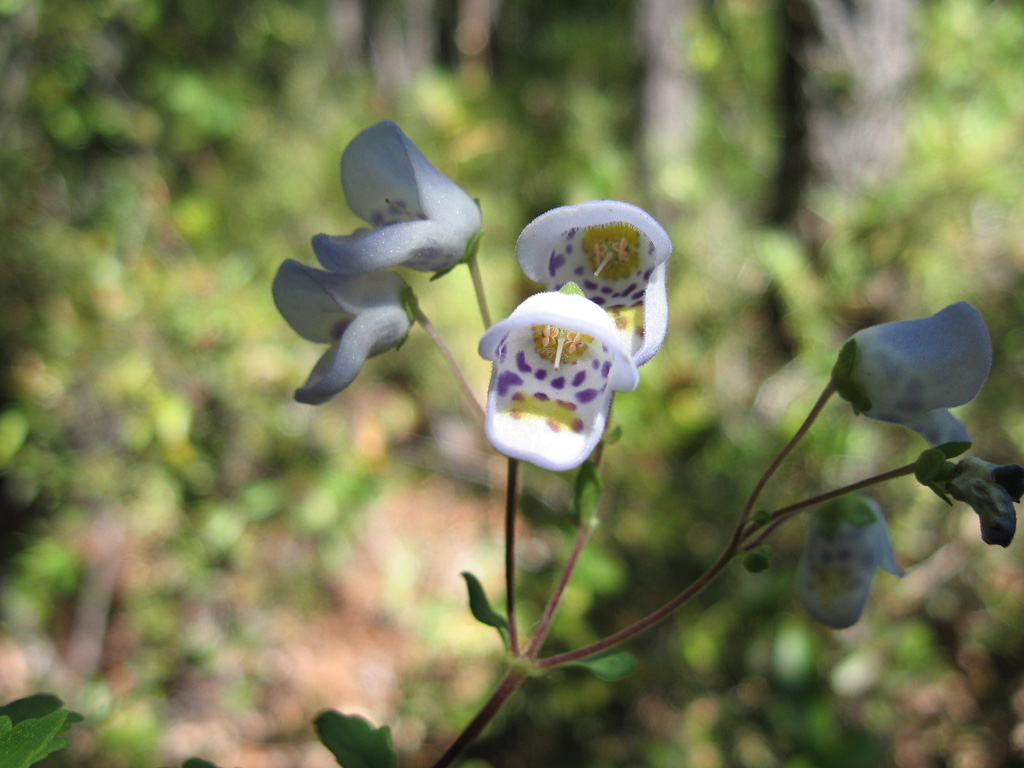

Scientific classification
- Kingdom: Plantae
- Clade: Tracheophytes
- Clade: Angiosperms
- Clade: Eudicots
- Clade: Asterids
- Order: Lamiales
- Family: Calceolariaceae
- Genus: Jovellana
- Species: J. punctata

Binomial name
- Jovellana punctata Ruiz & Pav.

Synonyms
- Calceolaria punctata (Ruiz & Pav.) Vahl; Fagelia punctata (Ruiz & Pav.) Kuntze; Boea punctata (Ruiz & Pav.) Pers.; Calceolaria punctata var. puncticulata (Phil.) Reiche; Calceolaria puncticulata Phil.; Jovellana punctata var. coerulea Kraenzl.

= Jovellana punctata =

Species of flowering plant

Jovellana punctata, or the teacup flower, is a perennial species of flowering plant in the family Calceolariaceae. It is native to central Chile.

== Taxonomy ==
This species is believed to have diverged from its New Zealand counterparts approximately 4.1Mya. It then diverged from Jovellana violacea about 1.0Mya.

== Description ==
Jovellana punctata is a semi-evergreen plant that has red stems with toothed, bright green leaves.

Its flowers are white, light pink or light lilac and can grow up to be 1.5m tall and can spread 0.6m.

It is said to have a minty-spicy fragrance.

== Cultivation ==
This plant can be propagated with stem tip cuttings.

It prefers to grow in loamless, fertile soil under direct sunlight. It should be watered regularly.

This species is said to grow well with Jovellana violacea, a closely related species.
