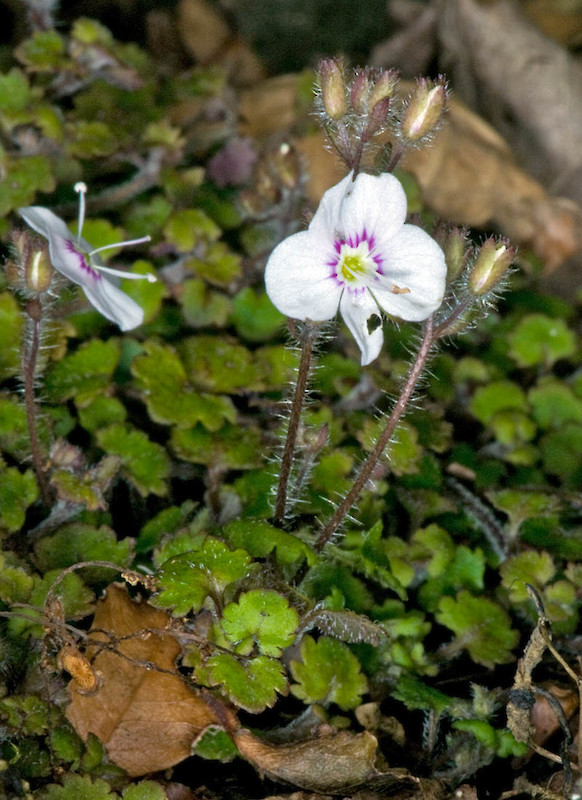

Conservation status
- Nationally Critical (NZ TCS)

Scientific classification
- Kingdom: Plantae
- Clade: Embryophytes
- Clade: Tracheophytes
- Clade: Spermatophytes
- Clade: Angiosperms
- Clade: Eudicots
- Clade: Asterids
- Order: Lamiales
- Family: Plantaginaceae
- Genus: Veronica
- Species: V. jovellanoides

Binomial name
- Veronica jovellanoides Garn.-Jones & de Lange
- Known native range

Synonyms
- Parahebe jovellanoides (Garn.-Jones & de Lange) de Lange

= Veronica jovellanoides =

Species of flowering plant in the plantain family

Veronica jovellanoides, commonly known as Riverhead speedwell, is a threatened flowering plant in the family Plantaginaceae. It is endemic to New Zealand, where only three plants are known in the wild. All are found within the Ernest Morgan Reserve, a 20 ha forest northwest of Auckland. Its discovery is accredited to a retired plant nursery owner, Geoff Davidson, who organised the land's protection a few decades prior, and found it by chance on a walk in November 2007.

V. jovellanoides has a prostrate growth habit, forming large 2 to 3 m (6.6 to 9.8 ft) mats on the ground, and long stems with small, spatula-shaped leaves. Flowering begins in spring (September to November in New Zealand), producing small four-petalled white flowers which have a purple ring around their throats; the inner and centre-most section of the flower. Once pollinated, these become small brown seeds which are dispersed by the wind.

== Description ==
Veronica jovellanoides is a creeping plant which grows into a mat 2 to 3 m (6.6 to 9.8 ft) across. It has 2 m (6.6 ft) long red-brown decumbent stems which are covered in many tiny hairs and grow roots at nodes spaced 5 to 30 mm (0.20 to 1.2 in) apart. Although it can cover a large area, it grows prostrate and only reaches a height of 5 centimetres (2.0 in). It has 3.5 to 11 mm (0.14 to 0.43 in) by 4.5 to 12 mm (0.18 to 0.47 in) spatula-shaped leaves which are green on top and a paler green below. The leaves may also grow on top of one another, have reddish margins, and are suspended from 2 to 10 mm long very hairy petioles. In addition to this, the leaves are hairy and toothed; with three to five pairs of teeth on each side.

Flowering occurs from October to December and produces a white flower which has a four-lobed corolla (four petals) and a purple ring around its throat; the ring serving as a nectar guide for pollinators. The flower is 10 to 12 mm (0.39 to 0.47 in) in diameter and the throat is a yellow-green colour. Each inflorescence is made up of up to seven flowers growing off of a raceme-like structure made of a 15-to-25 mm (0.59-to-0.98 in) long peduncle and a 20 to 30 mm (0.79 to 1.2 in) rachis. Pollen is given out by a stamen made of a 4.0-to-4.5 mm (0.16-to-0.18 in) long filament and a 0.8 to 1.0 mm long pink anther, the pollination of which is encouraged by a glabrous nectarial disk.

Fruiting is from December to February, yielding pale brown 1.2 to 1.8 mm by 1 to 1.4 mm seeds. The 3.2 to 6.0 mm (0.13 to 0.24 in) by 3.5 to 5.5 mm (0.14 to 0.22 in) pale brown capsules split open on wetting, revealing the similarly-coloured and deeply flattened seed. There are six to ten seeds per locule, within the 0.6 to 0.8 mm long glabrous ovary. V. jovellanoides has 20 pairs of chromosomes.

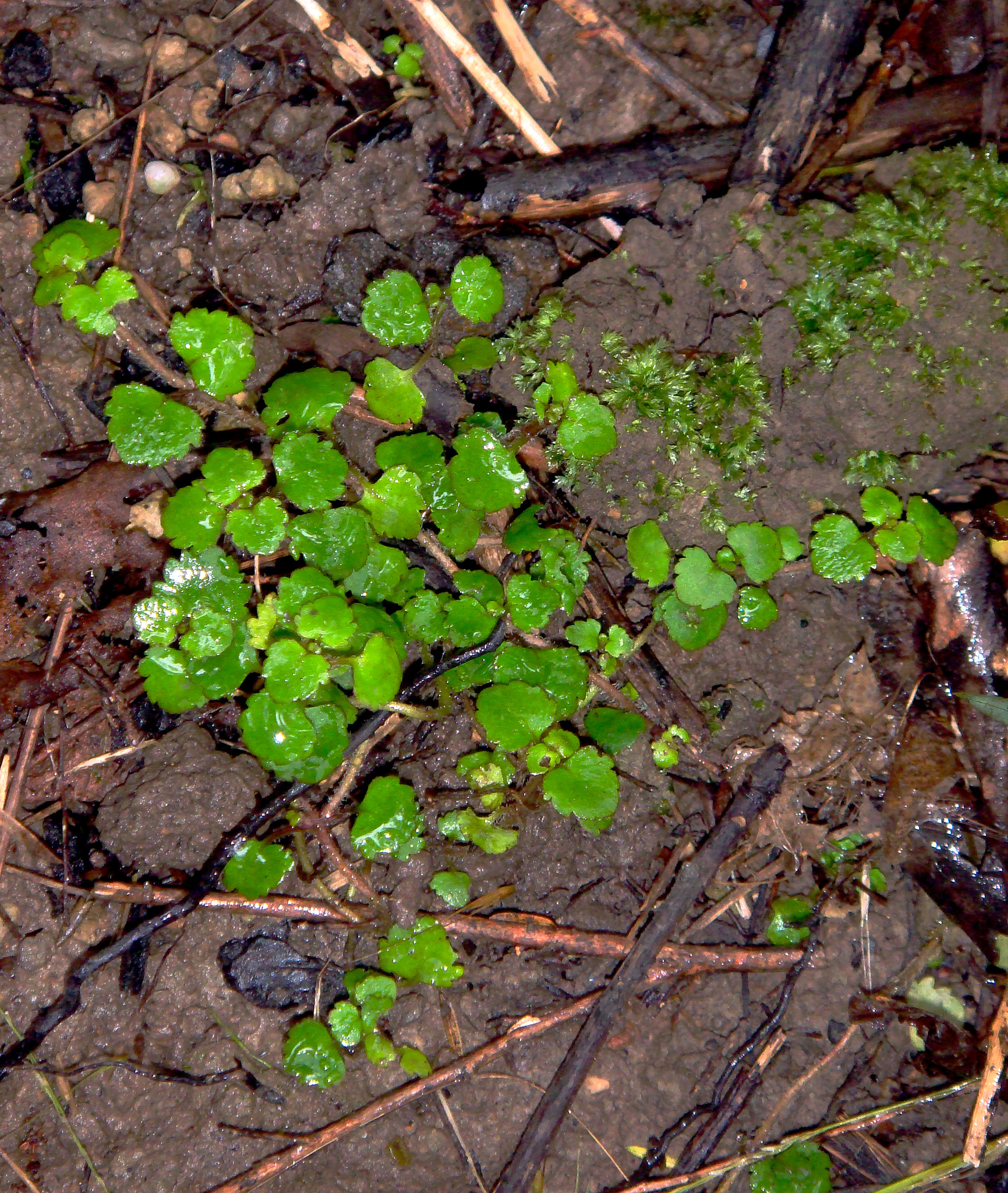
Leaves

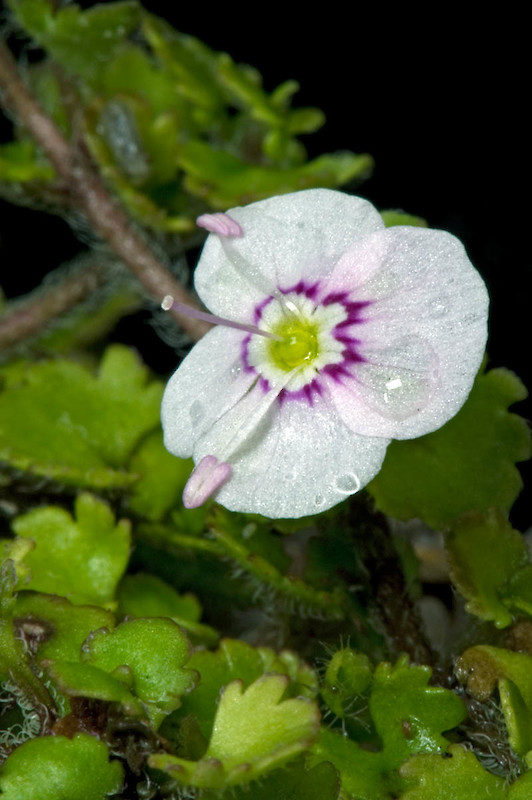
A close up of the flower

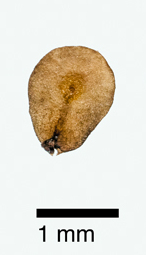
Seeds

== Taxonomy ==
=== Discovery and naming ===
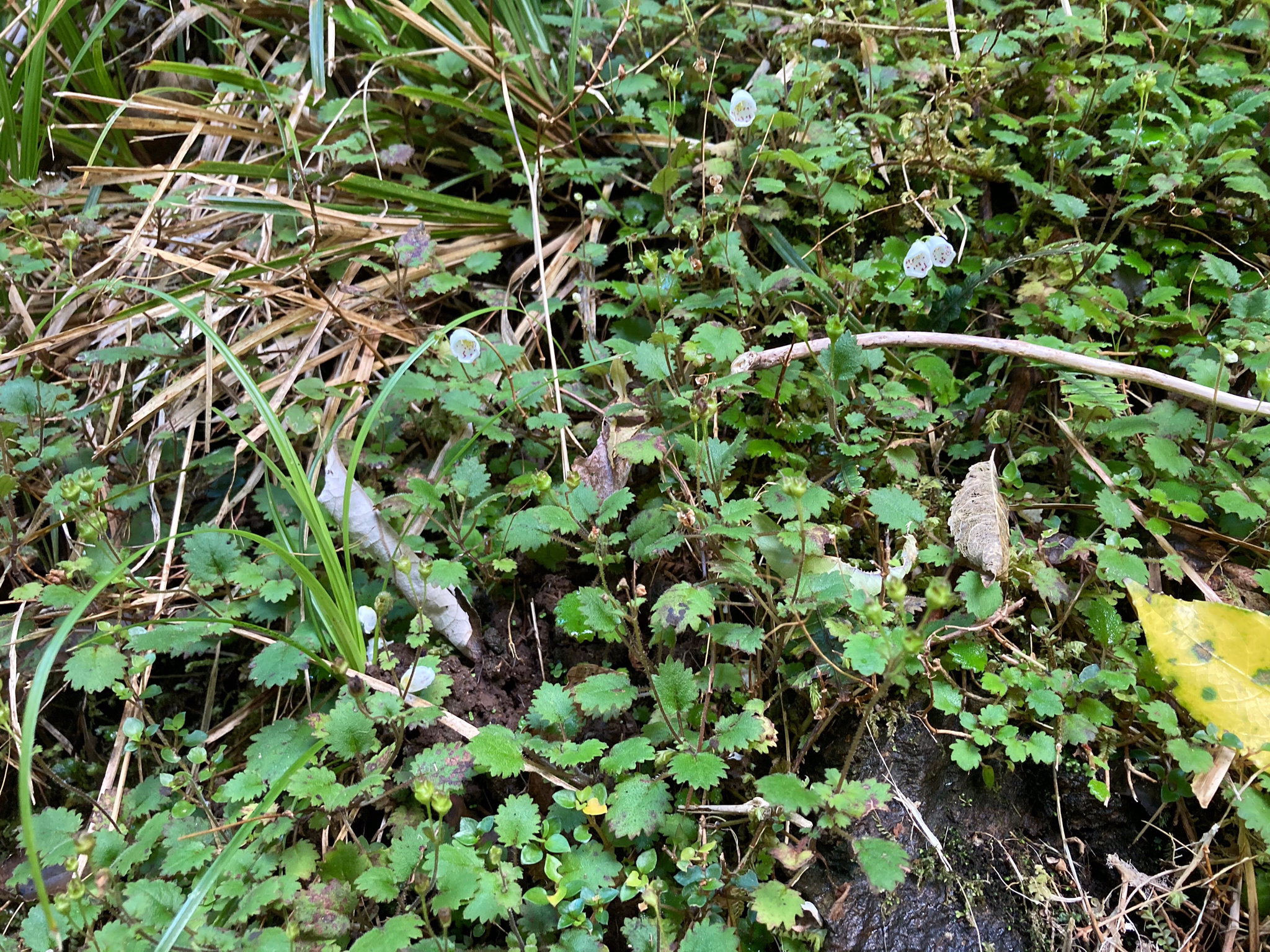
Jovellana repens, a similar but unrelated species with which V. jovellanoides was initially confused

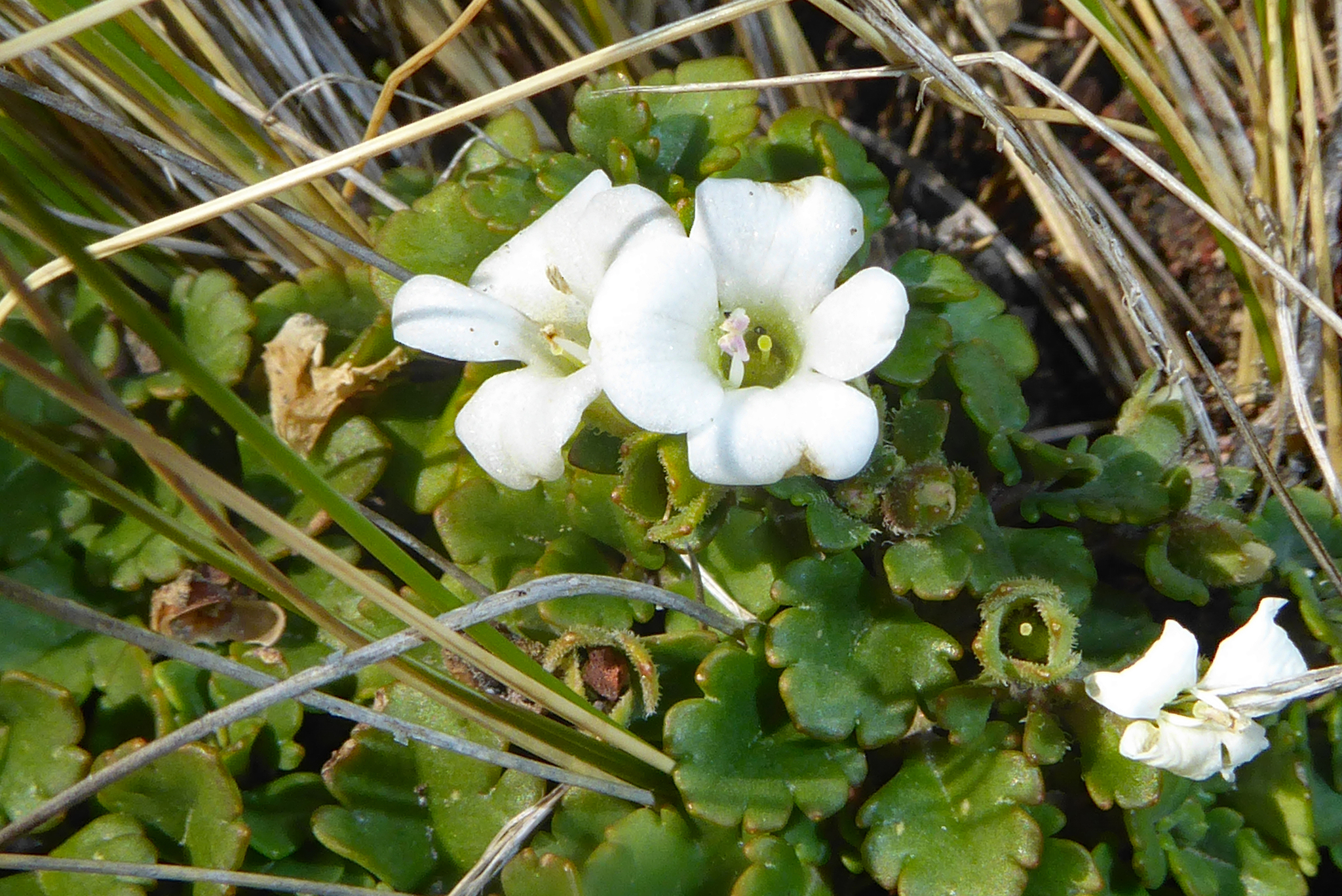
Veronica spathulata is member of the same genus as it and has some similar characteristics, but is very distinct beyond them.

Veronica jovellanoides was discovered in November 2007 by Geoff Davidson, a local plant nursery owner and trustee of the NZ Native Forests Restoration Trust, when he found it growing in the Ernest Morgan Reserve on a walk with the field officer (of the NZFRT) Sharon Graham. He mistook it for Jovellana repens at first, but was puzzled by the fact that the reserve is outside of its geographical range, so he took a cutting of it and grew it on. Peter de Lange, a New Zealand botanist, suggested after seeing the plant at Davidson's nursery that it was a member of the genus Veronica. This observation was proven upon the plant's flowering; its stunted corolla tube and four-lobed corolla being characteristic of many species in the genus. An expert of New Zealand Hebe and related genera, Phil Garnock-Jones, was consulted and it was revealed that it was a species new to science. Davidson, de Lange, and Garnock-Jones published their findings in the New Zealand Journal of Botany (NZJB) in 2009. In 2010 Peter de Lange moved the species into the genus Parahebe because many botanists believed that it should be separate from Veronica, though more recent scientific consensus among botanists is that Parahebe, along with many similar genera, should be merged with Veronica.

V. jovellanoides does not resemble other species in the genus Veronica, being highly distinctive. Species from the Northern Hemisphere share its creeping herbaceous growth habit, but ones from New Zealand share its: short-tubed corolla; yellowish-green throat; magenta ring; and spatula-shaped leaves. Almost all of the latter species have folds in the lateral lobes of their flowers, however, which V. jovellanoides lacks. The three members of this clade which lack the folds are not totally morphologically similar. V. spathulata, for example, shares its lack of folds and also has spatula-shaped leaves, but has different flowers and is otherwise dissimilar. These features, or lack thereof, they argued, suggest that it diverged early from the Parahebe clade, an idea supported by a then unpublished genetic analysis. This analysis was published in the NZJB in 2013 and in it they concluded that V. jovellanoides' 20 pairs of chromosomes was unusual given the very few related species that shared the number.

=== Etymology ===
The specific epithet jovellanoides is due to its similarity to Jovellana repens with which it was first confused. The common name Riverhead speedwell is after the Riverhead Pine Plantation, a popular recreation spot for Aucklanders, located close to the Ernest Morgan Reserve.

V. jovellanoides was given the nickname "Bamboozle", meaning to confuse or throw off, by botanists due to its elusive nature. On trying to find the plant again after its discovery, four people searched the reserve for 80 hours without locating it. Only when 40 members of the Auckland Botanical Society walked together in a line did they find one patch of it.

== Distribution and habitat ==
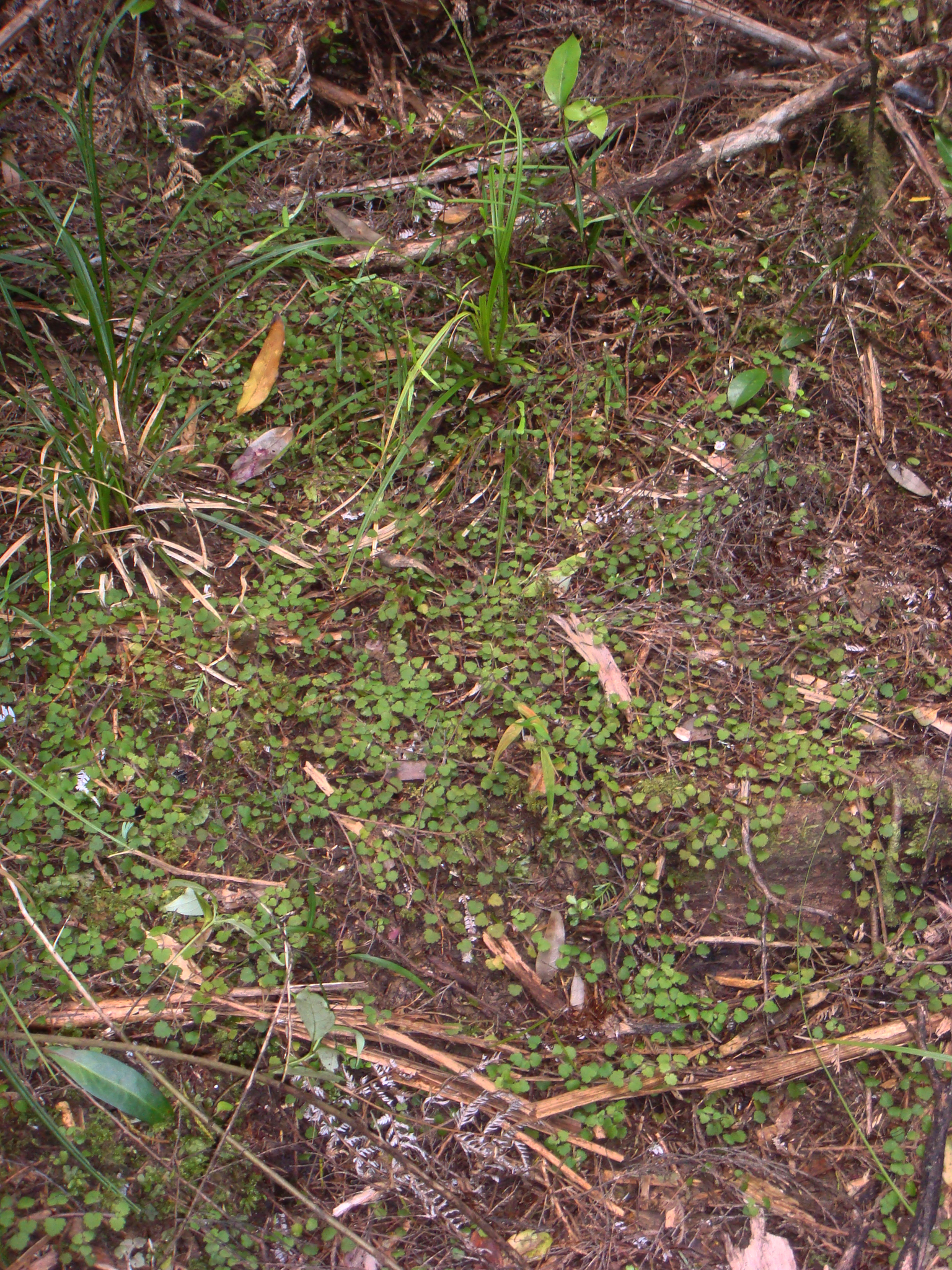
The growth habit

V. jovellanoides is endemic to New Zealand and occurs only (as of 2009) in the upper North Island in the Ernest Morgan Reserve northwest of Auckland. The 20 ha (49-acre) reserve was formed in 1985 when the land was bought from the landowners by a combination of the NZ Native Forests Restoration Trust, the Auckland Regional Authority and the Queen Elizabeth II National Trust (who were chosen to administer it).

There are only three plants known in the wild, all within an area of 6 m^{2} (7.2 sq yd) just 35 m (38 yd) above sea level, growing on a shaded and damp clay bank among ferns, mosses and liverworts. The reserve has the Ararimu Stream running through its southern boundary which was used by Māori as a portage route between the Waitemata and Kaipara harbours. It contains a variety of forest types, such as riparian podocarp forest and successional forest, as well as having several other relatively rare plants. Larger trees include: Dacrycarpus dacrydioides (Kahikatea), Prumnopitys taxifolia (Mataī), and Podocarpus totara var. totara, while Kunzea aff. ericoides (Kānuka) dominates the successional forest. Other species include Phyllocladus trichomanoides (Tanekaha) and some juvenile Agathis australis (Kauri).

The three known wild specimens grow in association with Uncinia banksii, U. uncinata, Nertera dichondrifolia, Clematis paniculata, Parsonsia heterophylla, Monoclea forsteril, Leiomitria lanata and Freycinetia banksii. A large number of lichens and bryophytes were also found in the area including: Achrophyllum dentatum, Balantiopsis diplophylla, Bazzania adnexa, Heteroscyphus cunestipulis, Lembidium nutans, Leiomitria lanata, Monoclea forsteri, Paracromastigium furcifolium, Pendulothecium auriculatum, Pyrrhobryum bifarium, Pseudocyphellaria dissimilis, P. multifida, Trichocolea mollisima, and Sticta lacera.

== Cultivation ==
V. jovellanoides is easily grown from both rooted pieces and stem cuttings, but growing from seed has not been tested as of 2009. Plants grown in Wellington have been observed to be very susceptible to a powdery mildew, though at Davidson's nursery in Auckland, where other nearby plants were being affected by a mildew, V. jovellanoides was not. In late summer (February in New Zealand) and autumn (March to May) it has been recorded dying back and becoming more difficult to maintain generally. It grows best in a sunny spot with only a small amount of shade and through some scoria pebbles or a similarly gritty material.
