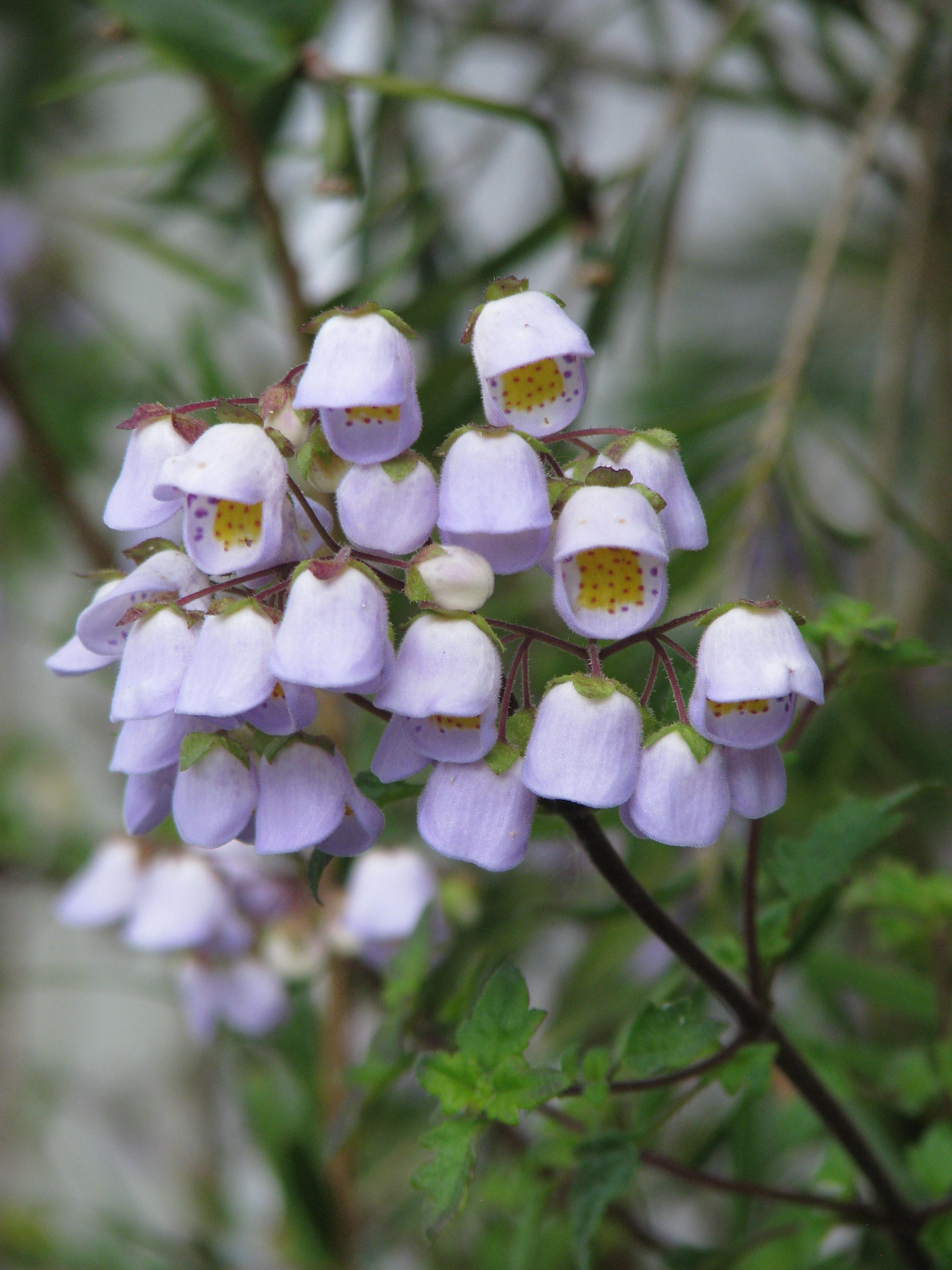

Scientific classification
- Kingdom: Plantae
- Clade: Tracheophytes
- Clade: Angiosperms
- Clade: Eudicots
- Clade: Asterids
- Order: Lamiales
- Family: Calceolariaceae
- Genus: Jovellana
- Species: J. violacea

Binomial name
- Jovellana violacea (Cav.) G.Don

Synonyms
- Boea violacea (Cav.) Pers.; Calceolaria violacea Cav.; Fagelia violacea (Cav.) Kuntze; Jovellana guentheri Kraenzl.

= Jovellana violacea =

Species of plant

Jovellana violacea, also known as the violet teacup flower or violet slipper flower, is a perennial species of flowering plant in the family Calceolariaceae. It is native to Chile.

== Taxonomy ==
The generic epithet commemorates Gaspar Melchor de Jovellanos.

This species is believed to have diverged from its New Zealand counterparts approximately 4.1Mya. It then diverged from Jovellana punctata about 1.0Mya.

== Etymology ==
The name "violacea" means "violet" which refers to the violet-coloured flowers of this species.

== Description ==
This species is a semi-evergreen, upright shrub with oval, lobed leaves that occur on red stems.

It can reach heights between 1.5 – 2.5m and 0.5 – 1m across.

This plant produces pale violet, bell-shaped flowers with dark purple spots. This species flowers in summer.

== Cultivation ==
This plant can be propagated with cuttings in summer.

It should be grown in loamy, well-drained, soil while under full, direct sunlight. It can be grown in both slightly acidic or alkaline soils. During the winter, it should be sheltered because even though this species is somewhat hardy, it is not tolerant of below-freezing temperatures.

It is also said to grow well in conjunction with Jovellana punctata.

It has gained the Award of Garden Merit (AGM) by the Royal Horticultural Society.

== Uses ==
This plant is mainly used for ornamental purposes.

== Distribution ==
This species is native to south-central and southern Chile.

== Toxicity ==
There are no known adverse effects associated with toxicity from J. violacea.
