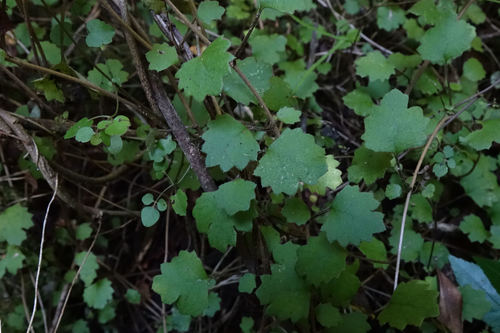

Conservation status
- Declining (NZ TCS)

Scientific classification
- Kingdom: Plantae
- Clade: Tracheophytes
- Clade: Angiosperms
- Clade: Eudicots
- Clade: Asterids
- Order: Asterales
- Family: Asteraceae
- Genus: Brachyglottis
- Species: B. sciadophila

Binomial name
- Brachyglottis sciadophila (Raoul) B.Nord.

Synonyms
- Senecio sciadophila Raoul

= Brachyglottis sciadophila =

Species of flowering plant in the daisy family

Brachyglottis sciadophila, commonly known as climbing groundsel, is a flowering plant in the family Asteraceae. It has long stems with small green leaves and bright yellow flowers. It is the only climbing daisy (Asteraceae is the daisy family) which has yellow flowers that is endemic to New Zealand.

== Description ==
Brachyglottis sciadophila is a flowering plant with 5 m long woody stems. It is a climber and can be usually found growing over plants or in mats along the ground. When young, the stems are hairy but as it matures they grow papery bark which easily peels off. The leaves are oval shaped 1.5–3 by 1.5–3 cm and have soft hairs on both sides. They are sharply toothed and grow from 2 cm long slender petioles. It has yellow flowers which have capitula that are less than 1 cm in diameter and come in small panicles. The pedicels are covered with many tiny hairs and the involucre are 5 mm long. Achenes are 1–5 mm long hispidulous (minutely hispid, meaning covered in tiny stiff hairs), and have 4 mm long pappus hairs.

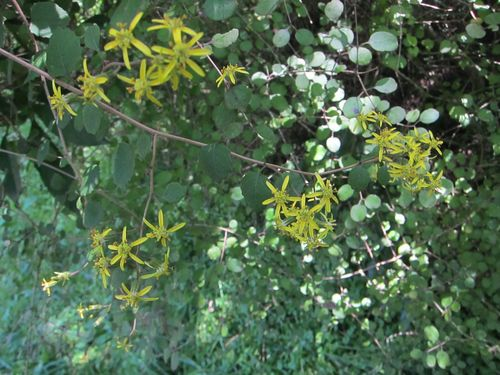
The flowers

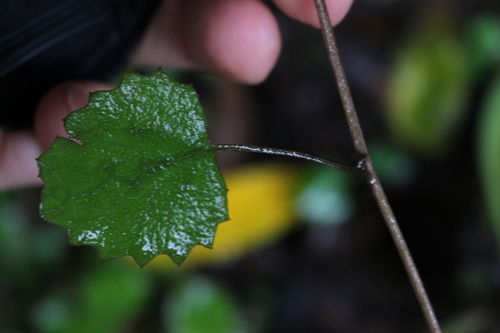
Top side of the leaf

== Etymology ==
Brachyglottis comes from the two Greek words: brachys, meaning short, and glottis which is the vocal apparatus of the larynx. Sciadophila is made up of two Greek words: skia meaning shade, and philios meaning loving. Hence sciadophila means shade-loving.
