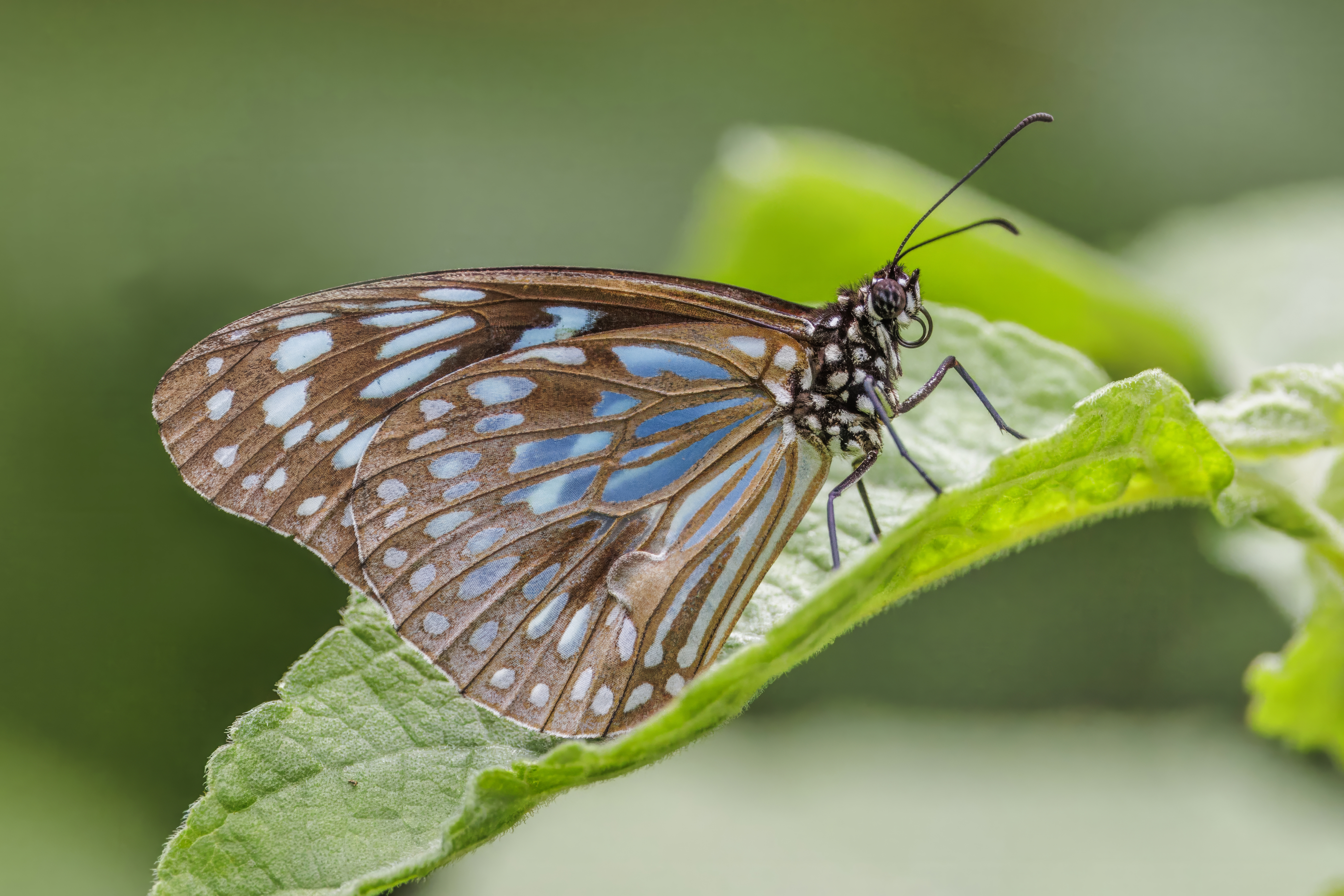
- Male
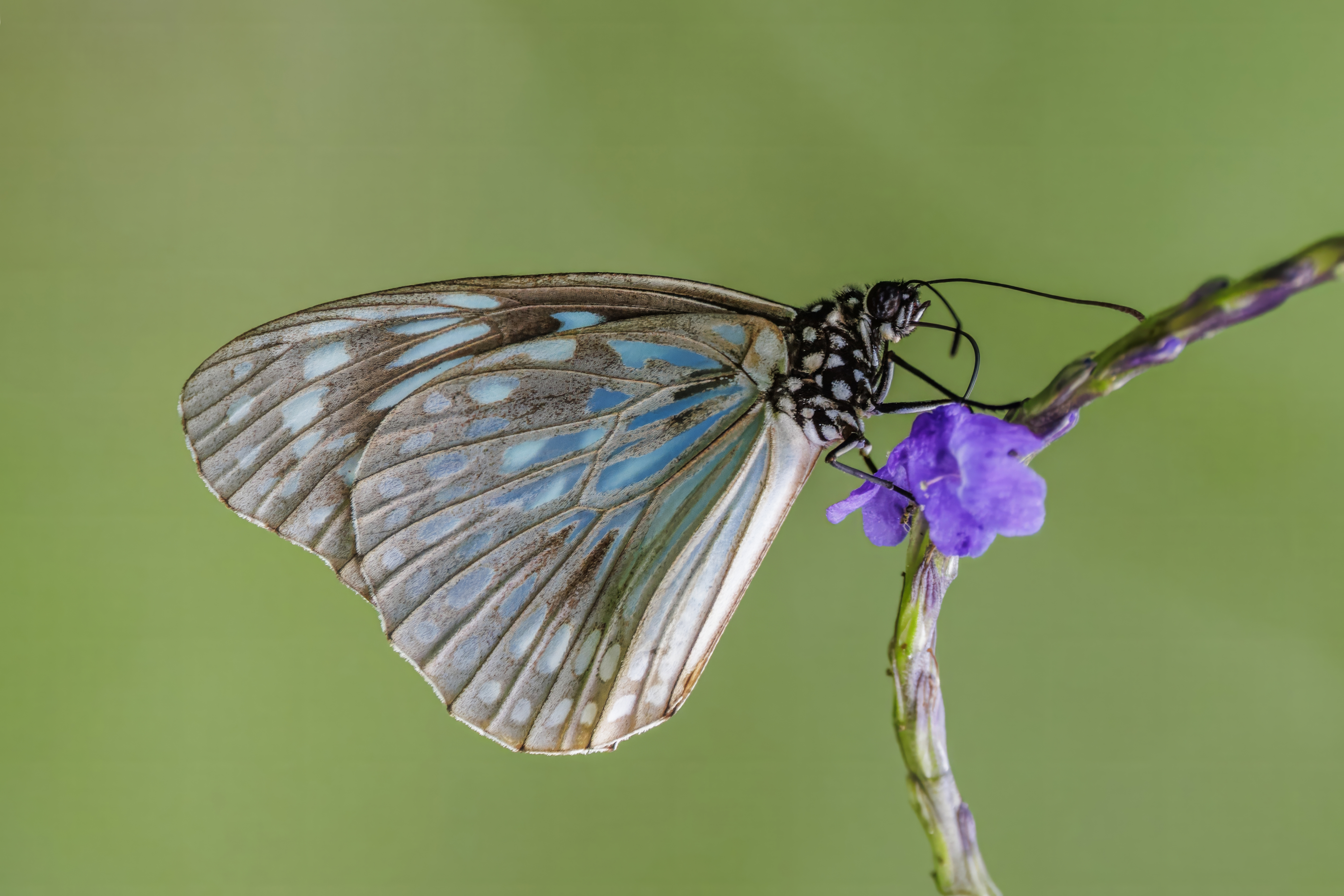
- Female both T. h. melittula, Samoa

Scientific classification
- Kingdom: Animalia
- Phylum: Arthropoda
- Class: Insecta
- Order: Lepidoptera
- Family: Nymphalidae
- Genus: Tirumala
- Species: T. hamata

Binomial name
- Tirumala hamata (MacLeay, [1826])

Synonyms
- Euploea hamata MacLeay, [1826]; Danais australis Blanchard, 1853; Papilio melissa Stoll, [1781]; Danais moderata Butler, [1876]; Danais hamata var. orientalis Semper, [1879]; Tirumala angustata Moore, 1883; Danaida nephthys Fruhstorfer, 1911; Danaida pelagia Fruhstorfer, 1911; Danaida sassina Fruhstorfer, 1911; Danaida tibula Fruhstorfer, 1911; Danaida melissa melissa f. melissina Rothschild, 1915; Danaida tutuilae Hopkins, 1927; Tirumala neomelissa Bryk, 1937; Danaus mendica Talbot, 1943; Danaida hamata paryadres Fruhstorfer, 1910; Danaida singaria Fruhstorfer, 1910; Danaida hamata arikata Fruhstorfer, 1910; Danais (Tirumala) melissa nigra Martin, 1910; Danais (Tirumala) hamata goana Martin, 1910; Danais leucoptera Butler, 1874; Danaus hamata talautensis Talbot, 1943; Danaus hamata pallidula Talbot, 1943; Danaus hamata subnubila Talbot, 1943; Danaida (Tirumala) melissa coarctata Joicey & Talbot, 1922; Danais obscurata Butler, 1874; Danaida gariata Fruhstorfer, 1910; Danaus hamata insignis Talbot, 1943; Danais neptunia C. & R. Felder, [1865]; Danais claribella Butler, 1882; Danaida hamata neptunia f. protoneptunia Poulton, 1924; Danais melittula Herrich-Schäffer, 1869

= Tirumala hamata =

Species of butterfly

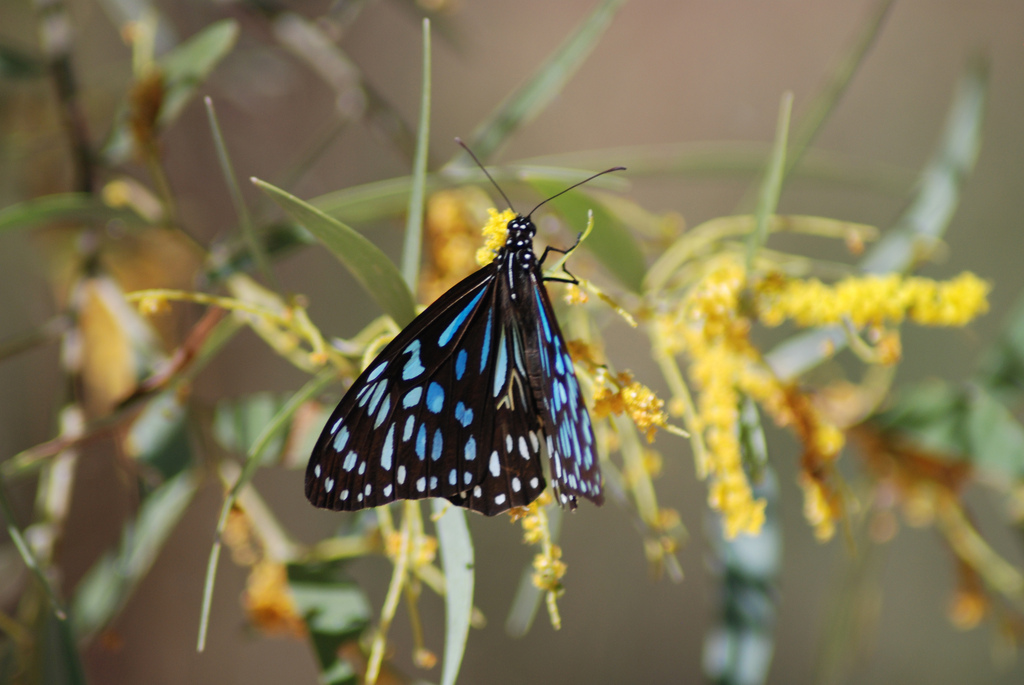

Tirumala hamata, the dark tiger, is a butterfly of the family Nymphalidae. It is distributed from the Philippines to Australia and Pacific oceanic islands such as Samoa. In Australia, the butterflies perform mass migrations to the south in some years. In April 1995, the butterfly made a rare migratory journey to New Zealand, coinciding with the appearance of Hypolimnas bolina on the islands.

The wingspan is about 70 mm. Adults have black wings with blue spots. They are grey with black bands between segments and orange lateral lines and a black head with white markings. Adults have been observed scratching the leaves of Heliotropium amplexicaule and Parsonsia straminea, possibly to suck out moisture, or to obtain pyrrolizidine alkaloids for pheromone production and/or chemical defense.

The larvae feed on a wide range of plants including Parsonsia (including Parsonsia straminea and Parsonsia velutina), Heterostemma papuana, Heterostemma acuminatum, Hoya australis, Leichhardtia, Marsdenia (including Marsdenia velutina), Secanome carnosum, Secamone elliptica, Vincetoxicum (syn. Tylophora), Cryptostegia grandiflora, Cynanchum carnosum, and Cynanchum leptolepis.

== Subspecies ==
- T. h. hamata (MacLeay, [1826]) (Australia: Cape York to Sydney)
- T. h. angustata Moore, 1883 (Tonga)
- T. h. arikata (Fruhstorfer, 1910) (Sula Islands)
- T. h. coarctata (Joicey & Talbot, 1922) (Biak)
- T. h. goana (Martin, 1910) (southern Sulawesi)
- T. h. insignis (Talbot, 1943) (eastern Solomon Is.)
- T. h. leucoptera (Butler, 1874) (Waigeu, Gebe, Neomfoor, West Irian)
- T. h. melittula (Herrich-Schäffer, 1869) (Samoa)
- T. h. moderata Butler, 1875 (Vanuatu, New Caledonia)
- T. h. neomelissa Bryk, 1937 (Java)
- T. h. nepthys Fruhstorfer, 1911 (Sulu Is.)
- T. h. neptunia (C. & R. Felder, [1865]) (Fiji)
- T. h. nigra (Martin, 1910) (Buru, Ambon, Serang, Saparua)
- T. h. obscurata (Butler, 1874) (New Britain, New Ireland, Duke of York Group, Bougainville to Guadalcanal)
- T. h. orientalis Semper, 1879 (Luzon, Cebu)
- T. h. pallidula (Talbot, 1943) (West Irian)
- T. h. paryadres (Fruhstorfer, 1910) (Timor to Tanimbar, Aru and the Kai Islands)
- T. h. subnubila (Talbot, 1943) (Papua, Yule Island)
- T. h. talautensis (Talbot, 1943) (Talaud)
