= P. brownii =

P. brownii may refer to:

- Paeonia brownii, the Brown's peony or native peony, a herbaceous perennial flowering plant species native to the western United States
- Parsonsia brownii, the twining silkpod or mountain silkpod, a woody vine species found in New South Wales, Victoria and Tasmania in Australia
