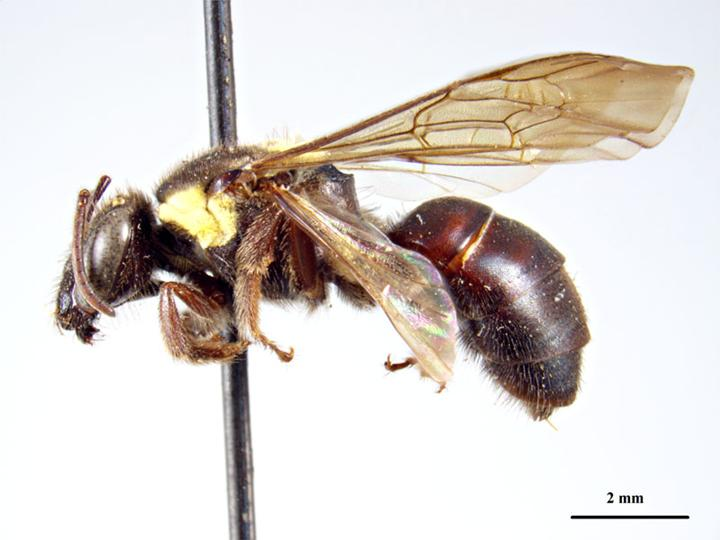
- Female
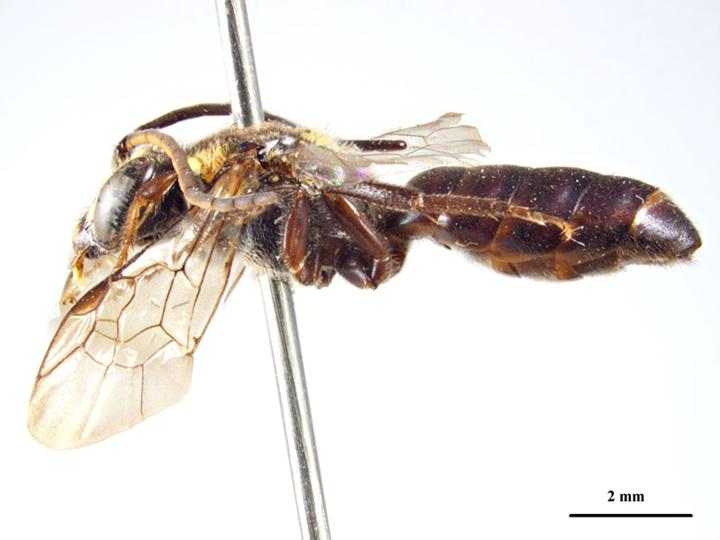
- Male

Scientific classification
- Kingdom: Animalia
- Phylum: Arthropoda
- Clade: Pancrustacea
- Class: Insecta
- Order: Hymenoptera
- Family: Halictidae
- Genus: Lasioglossum
- Species: L. musicum

Binomial name
- Lasioglossum musicum (Cockerell, 1913)

Synonyms
- Halictus musicus Cockerell, 1913; Halictus trimaculatus Friese, 1924

= Lasioglossum musicum =

Species of bee

Lasioglossum musicum, or Lasioglossum (Parasphecodes) musicum, is a species of bee in the family Halictidae and subfamily Halictinae. It is endemic to Australia. It was described by British-American entomologist Theodore Dru Alison Cockerell in 1913.

== Description ==
Female body length is about 10 mm. Integumental colouration is mainly black.

== Distribution and habitat ==
The species occurs in eastern Australia. Type localities include Mount Tamborine, in south-eastern Queensland.

== Behaviour ==
The adults are flying mellivores. Flowering plants visited by the bees include Parsonsia velutina, as well as Pollia, Argyrodendron, Rubus and Solanum species.

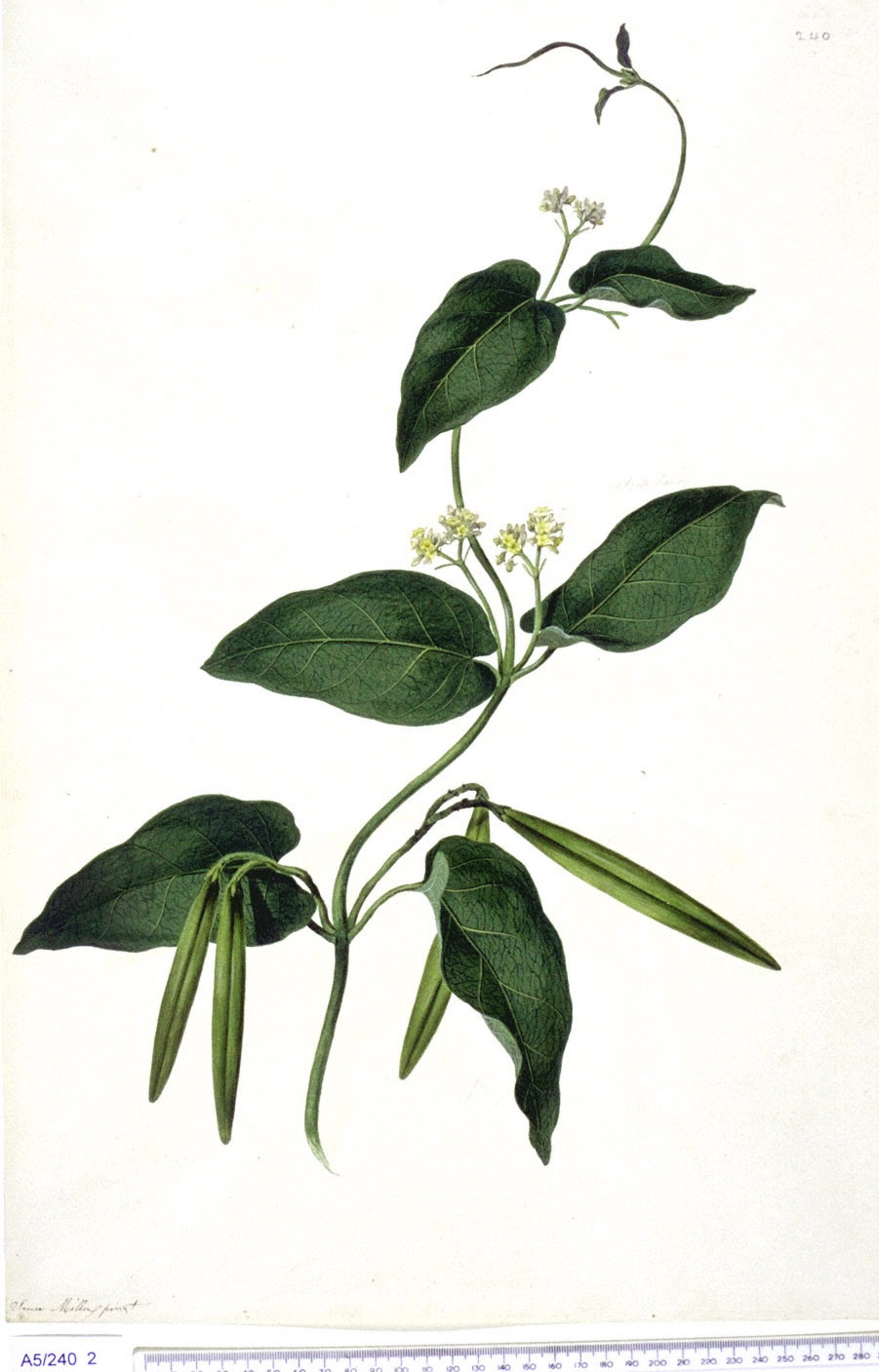
Parsonsia velutina (hairy silkpod), a forage plant of the bees
