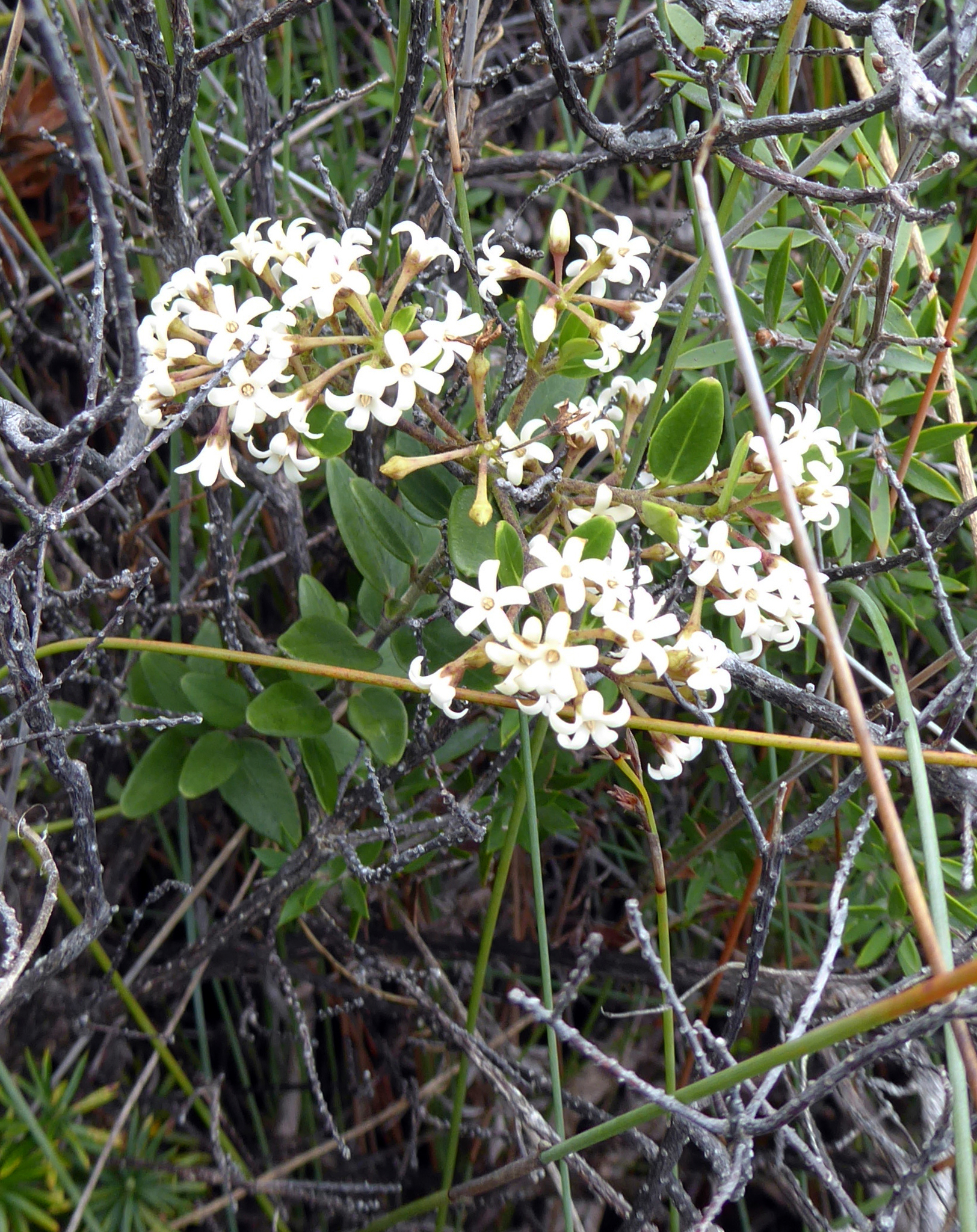
- (photograph: Peter de Lange)

Scientific classification
- Kingdom: Plantae
- Clade: Tracheophytes
- Clade: Angiosperms
- Clade: Eudicots
- Clade: Asterids
- Order: Gentianales
- Family: Apocynaceae
- Genus: Parsonsia
- Species: P. praeruptis

Binomial name
- Parsonsia praeruptis Heads & P.J. de Lange
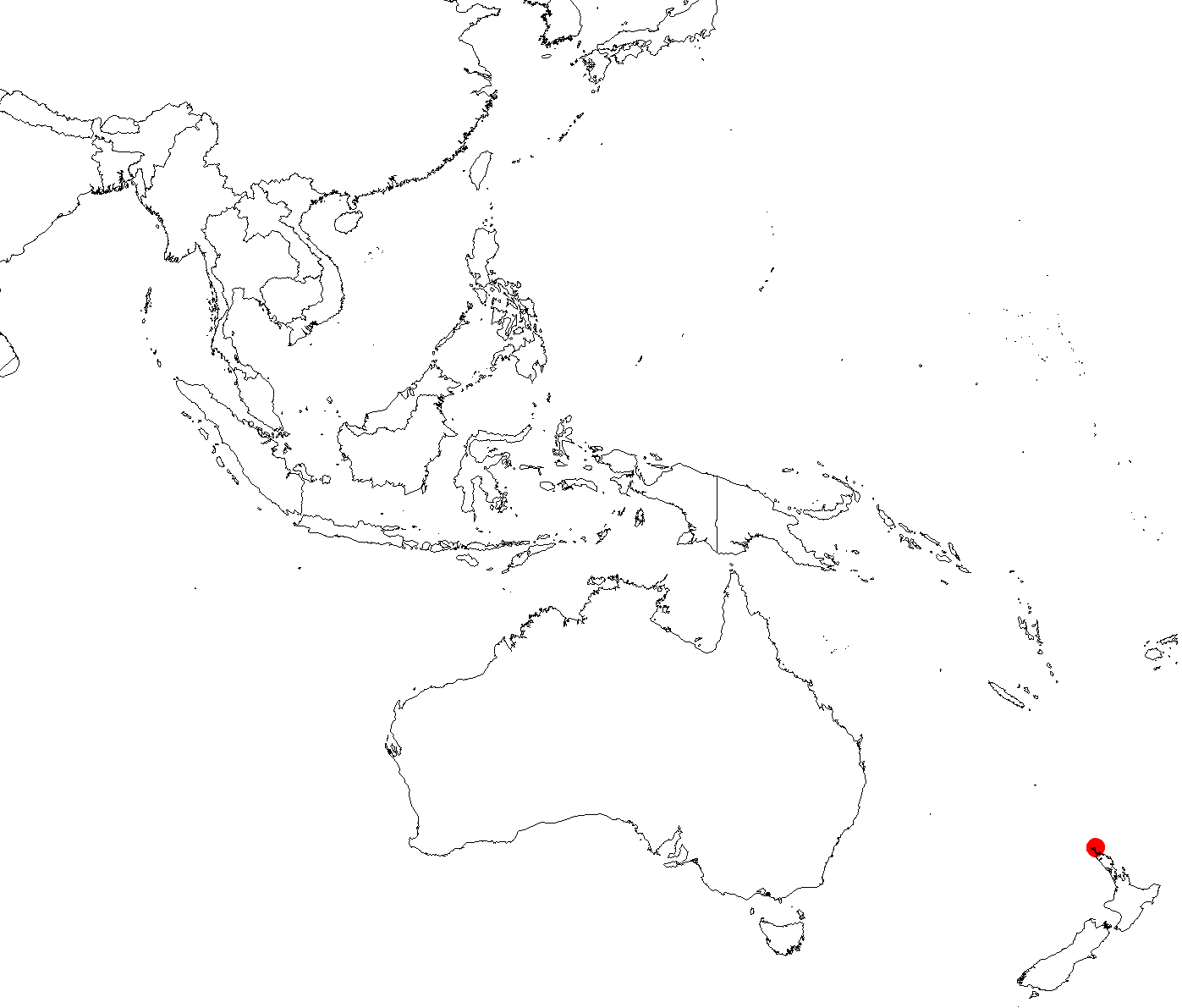
- Occurrence data from GBIF

= Parsonsia praeruptis =

Species of flowering plant

Parsonsia praeruptis is a non-twining, non-climbing Parsonsia, endemic to New Zealand and is a member of the dogbane family Apocynaceae. It is found only in the shrubland of the Surville Cliffs, North Cape Peninsula, where it scrambles through "openly branched, prostrate windswept shrub(s)".

Possums attack buds, flowers and fruits of this species and where baiting for possums is not possible this plant is in decline because of possum browsing pressure.

== Taxonomy ==
Parsonsia praeruptis was first described by P.J. de Lange and M.J. Heads in 1999.

== Etymology ==
The specific epithet, praeruptis. derives from the Latin, praeruptus, dative or ablative plural for hasty, rash or precipitate.

== Conservation status ==
Its status is "Threatened — Nationally Critical".

== See also ==
- Flora of New Zealand
