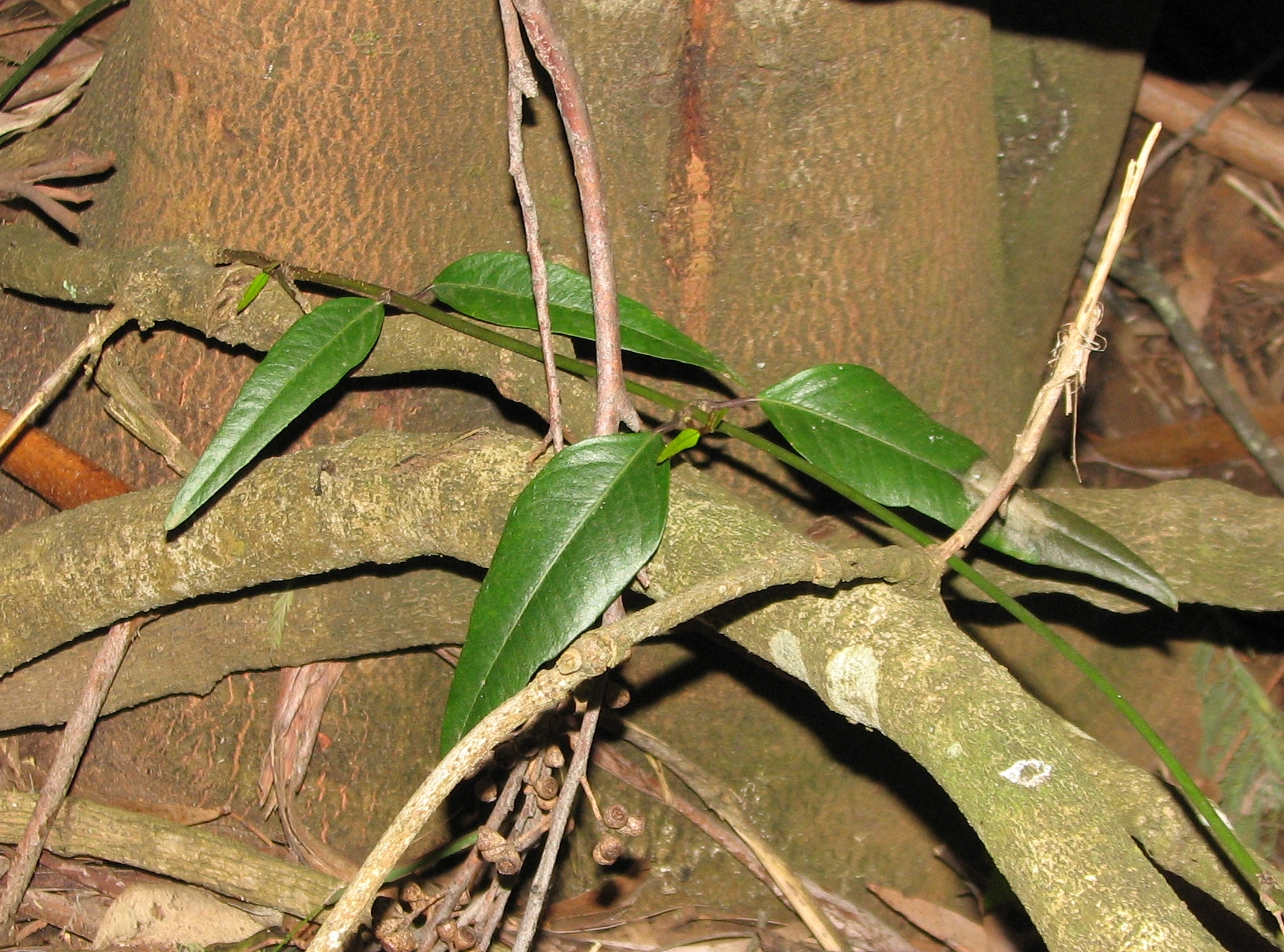
- Parsonsia brownii, Sherbrooke Forest, Victoria

Scientific classification
- Kingdom: Plantae
- Clade: Tracheophytes
- Clade: Angiosperms
- Clade: Eudicots
- Clade: Asterids
- Order: Gentianales
- Family: Apocynaceae
- Genus: Parsonsia
- Species: P. brownii

Binomial name
- Parsonsia brownii (Britten) Pichon
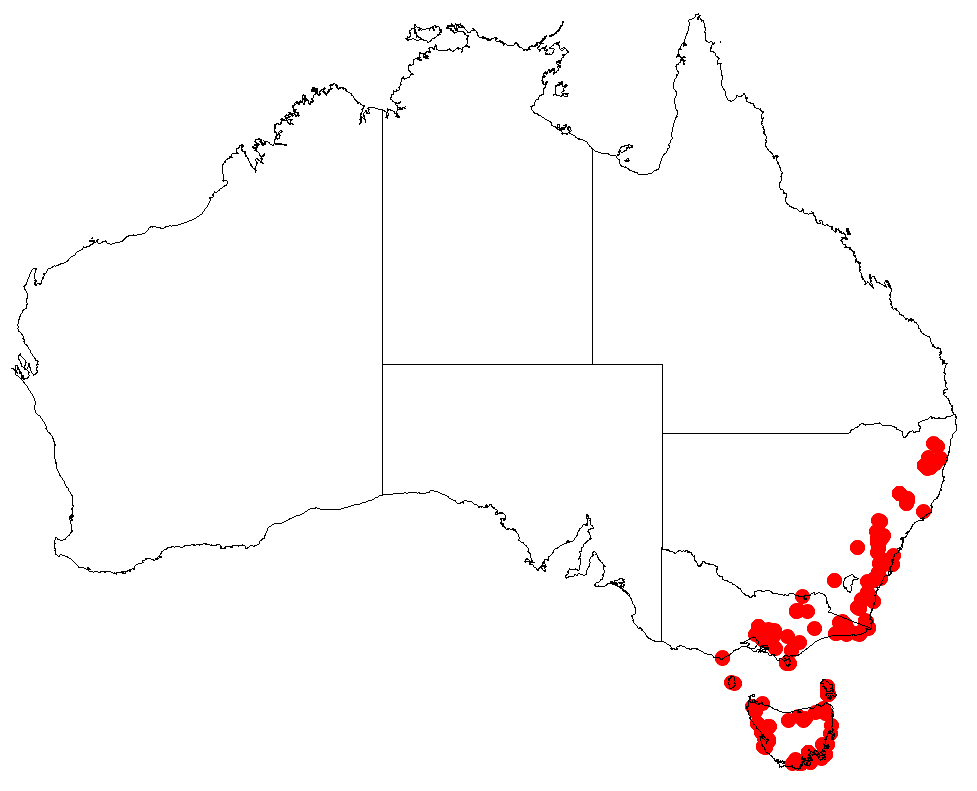
- Occurrence data from AVH

Synonyms
- Lyonsia brownii Britten

= Parsonsia brownii =

Species of flowering plant

Parsonsia brownii, commonly known as twining silkpod or mountain silkpod, is a woody vine of the dogbane family, Apocynaceae. It occurs in rainforest in the states of New South Wales, Victoria and Tasmania in Australia.

== Description ==
The species climbs to 10 or more metres in height and has a watery sap. The glossy leaves are lanceolate, up to 20 centimetres long and 4 centimetres wide, and taper towards the tip. Juvenile leaves are narrower and new growth is down-covered. Small, sweetly scented yellow and brown flowers are produced in loose terminal panicles between August and December. These are followed by long, slender pods which are 5 to 10 centimetres in length.

== Taxonomy ==
The species was first formally described as Lyonsia brownii by botanist James Britten in Journal of Botany, British and Foreign in 1907. The species was placed in the genus Parsonsia by French botanist Marcel Pichon in 1950 in Notulae Systematicae. The names Lysonia straminea and Parsonsia straminea have been misapplied to this species in the past.

== Cultivation ==
The species is not commonly cultivated and is considered too vigorous for most gardens. It requires cool, moist conditions. Plants are commercially available from local indigenous plant nurseries.

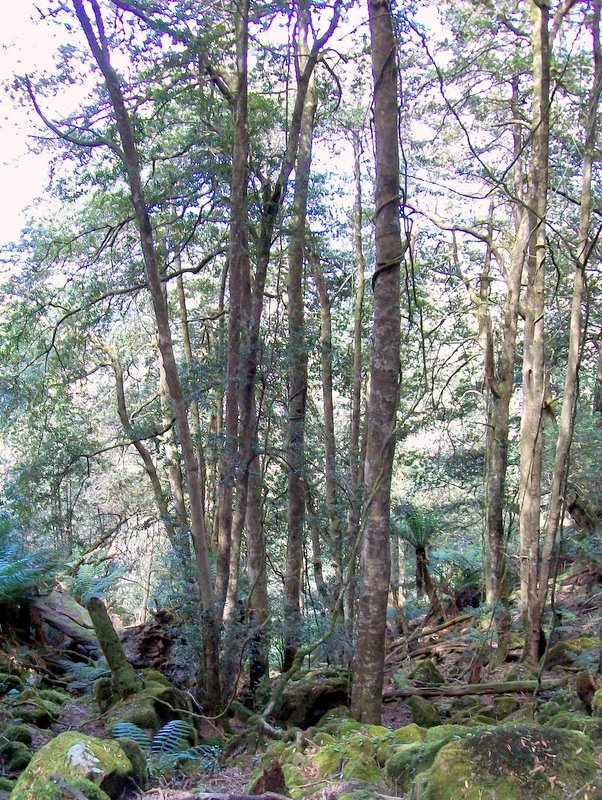
Parsonsia brownii vine growing over a black olive berry tree at Mount Imlay, Australia
