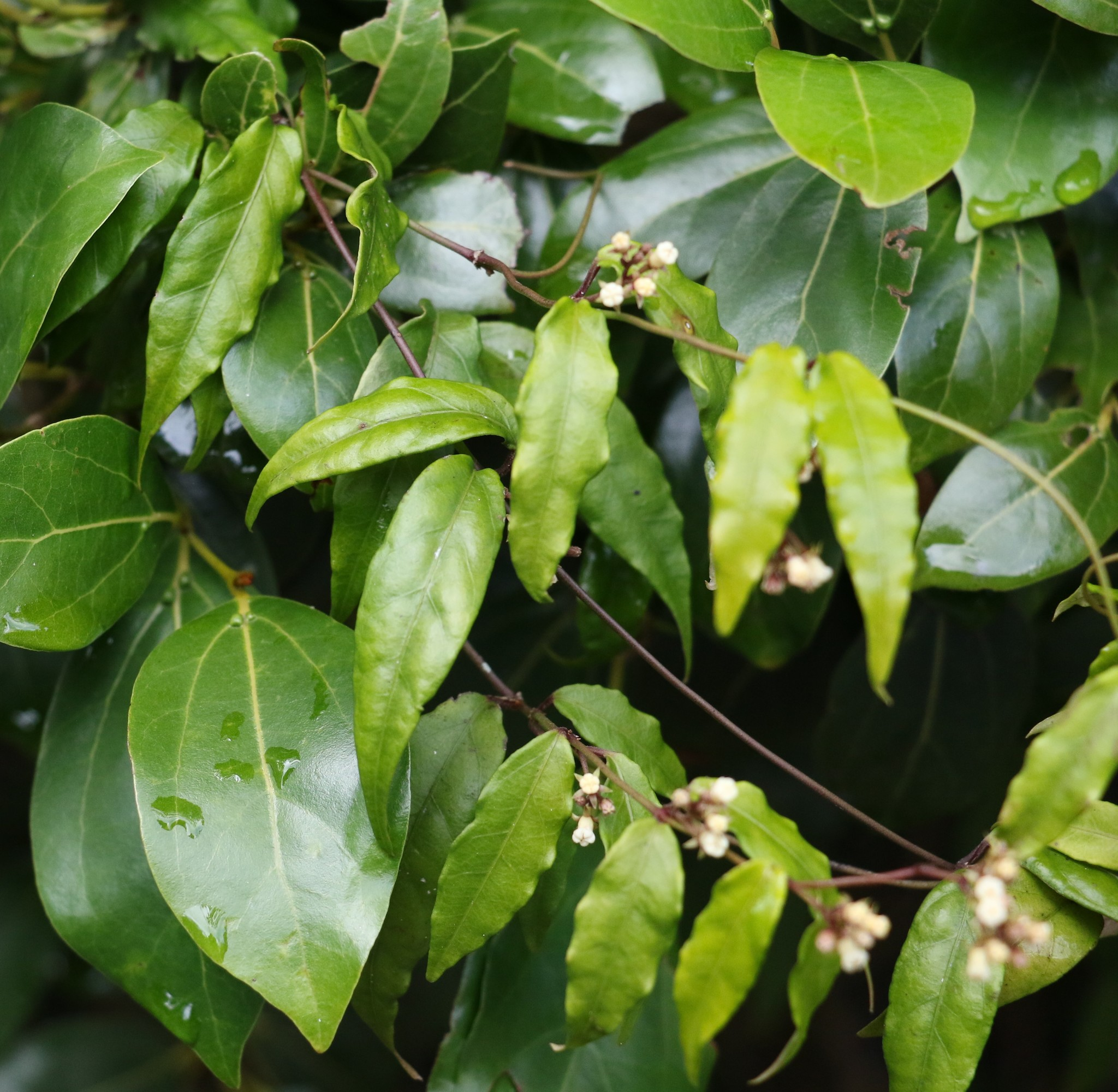

Scientific classification
- Kingdom: Plantae
- Clade: Embryophytes
- Clade: Tracheophytes
- Clade: Spermatophytes
- Clade: Angiosperms
- Clade: Eudicots
- Clade: Asterids
- Order: Gentianales
- Family: Apocynaceae
- Genus: Parsonsia
- Species: P. induplicata

Binomial name
- Parsonsia induplicata F.Muell.

= Parsonsia induplicata =

Species of plant

Parsonsia induplicata, the thin-leaf silkpod, is a small climbing plant in the family Apocynaceae. It occurs in rainforest in north eastern New South Wales and south eastern Queensland. Leaves are thin; 3 to 15 cm long, 1 to 4 cm wide.
