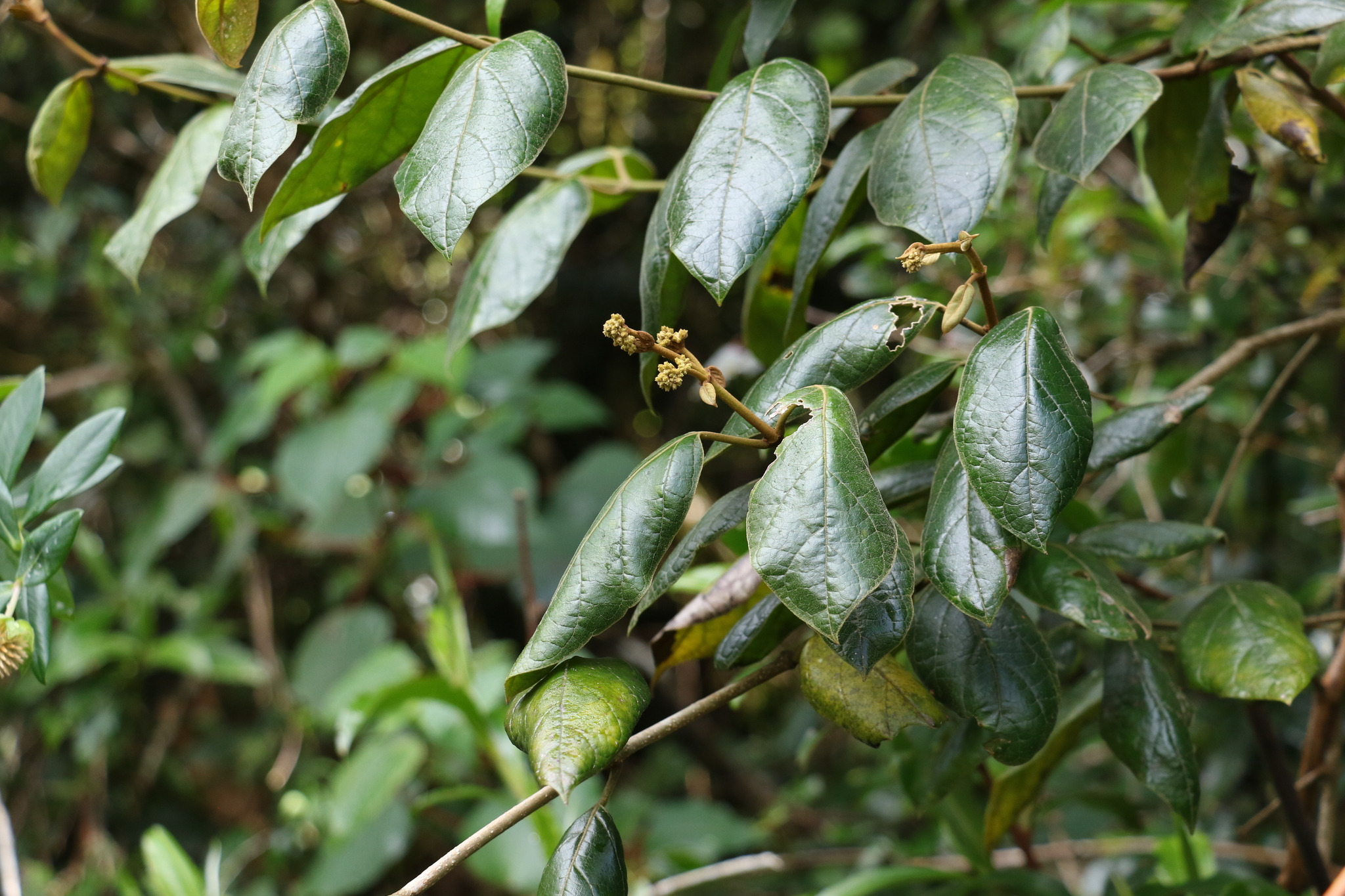

Scientific classification
- Kingdom: Plantae
- Clade: Embryophytes
- Clade: Tracheophytes
- Clade: Spermatophytes
- Clade: Angiosperms
- Clade: Eudicots
- Clade: Asterids
- Order: Gentianales
- Family: Apocynaceae
- Genus: Parsonsia
- Species: P. fulva

Binomial name
- Parsonsia fulva S.T.Blake
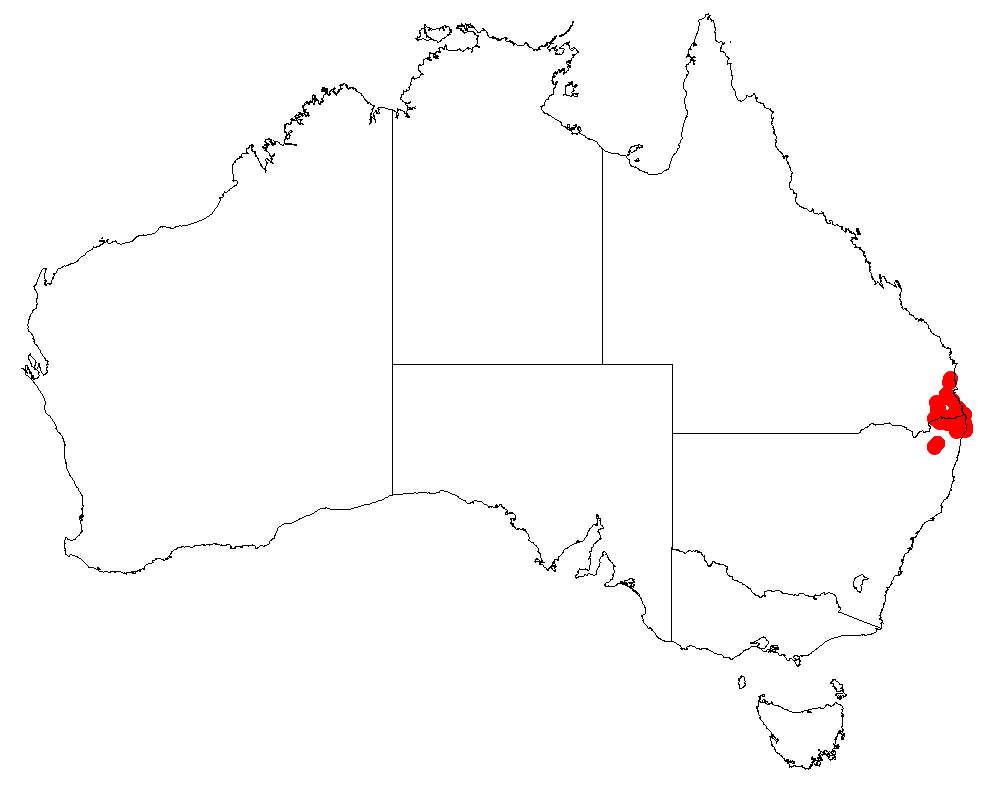

= Parsonsia fulva =

Species of plant

Parsonsia fulva, the furry silkpod, is a woody vine of the family Apocynaceae. It occurs in subtropical rainforest in north eastern New South Wales and south eastern Queensland, growing up to 30 metres long. Leaves are 8 to 20 cm long, 5 to 13 cm wide, with soft brown hairs on the underside.
