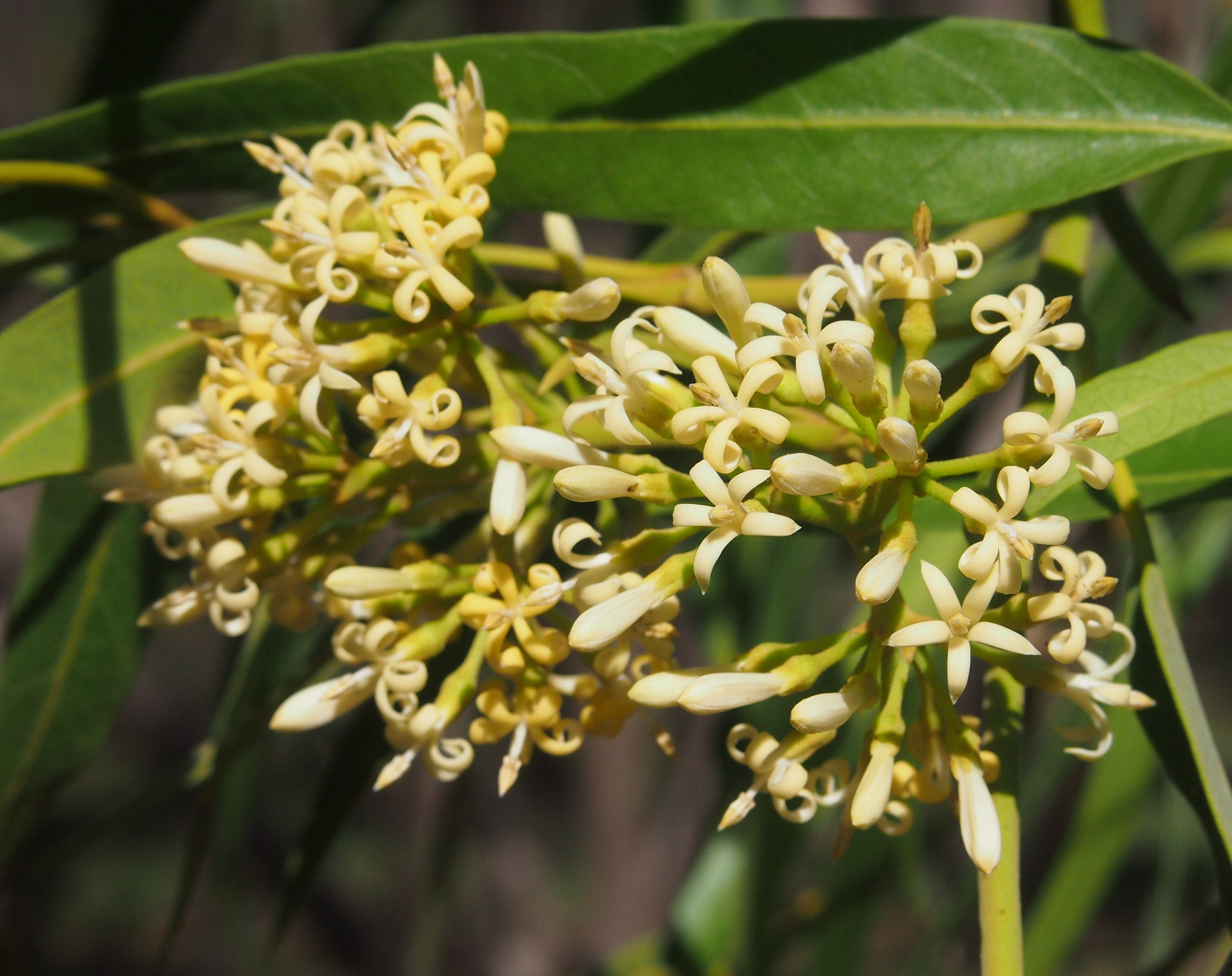
- Parsonsia eucalyptophylla

Scientific classification
- Kingdom: Plantae
- Clade: Tracheophytes
- Clade: Angiosperms
- Clade: Eudicots
- Clade: Asterids
- Order: Gentianales
- Family: Apocynaceae
- Genus: Parsonsia
- Species: P. eucalyptophylla

Binomial name
- Parsonsia eucalyptophylla F.Muell.
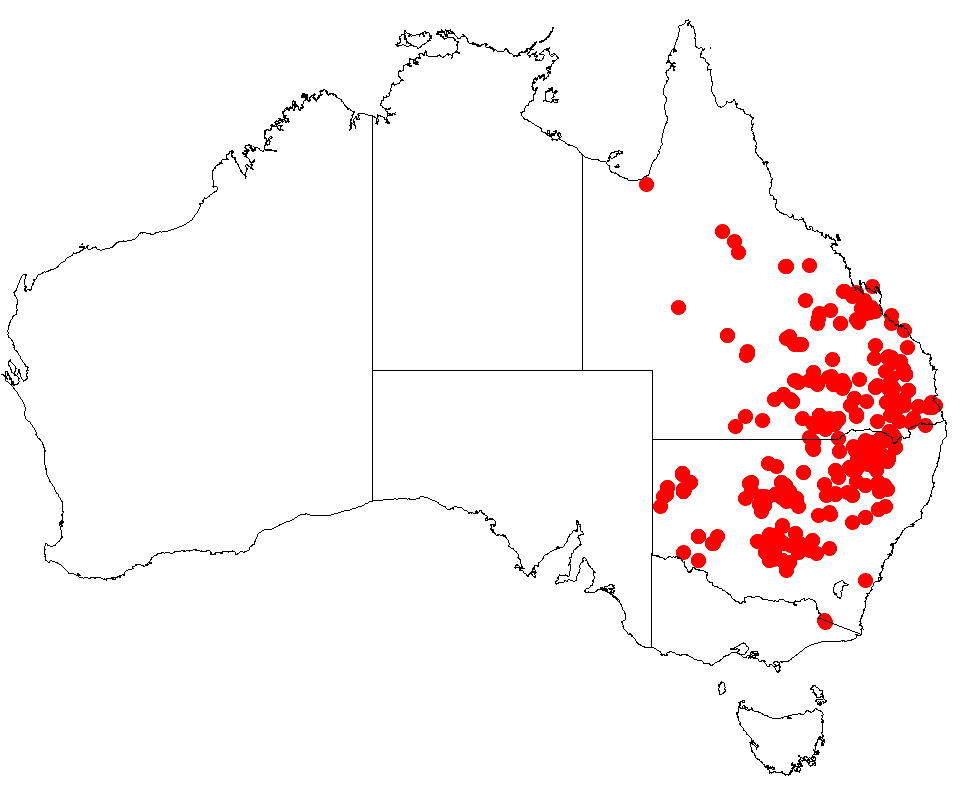
- Occurrence data from AVH

Synonyms
- Lyonsia eucalyptophylla (F.Muell.) Benth. Lyonsia eucalyptifolia Benth.

= Parsonsia eucalyptophylla =

Species of vine

Parsonsia eucalyptophylla, whose common names are gargaloo and monkey vine, is a woody vine in the family Apocynaceae. It is native to the east coast states of Australia.

== Description ==
Parsonsia eucalyptophylla is a tall woody climber; the young plants climb by clinging roots, and the older plants using twining stems. It has watery rather than milky sap. The yellow flowers appear from spring to autumn. The leaves are linear to lanceolate and 8–24 cm long and 0.5–2 cm wide, with lower surface paler than the upper.

== Gallery ==
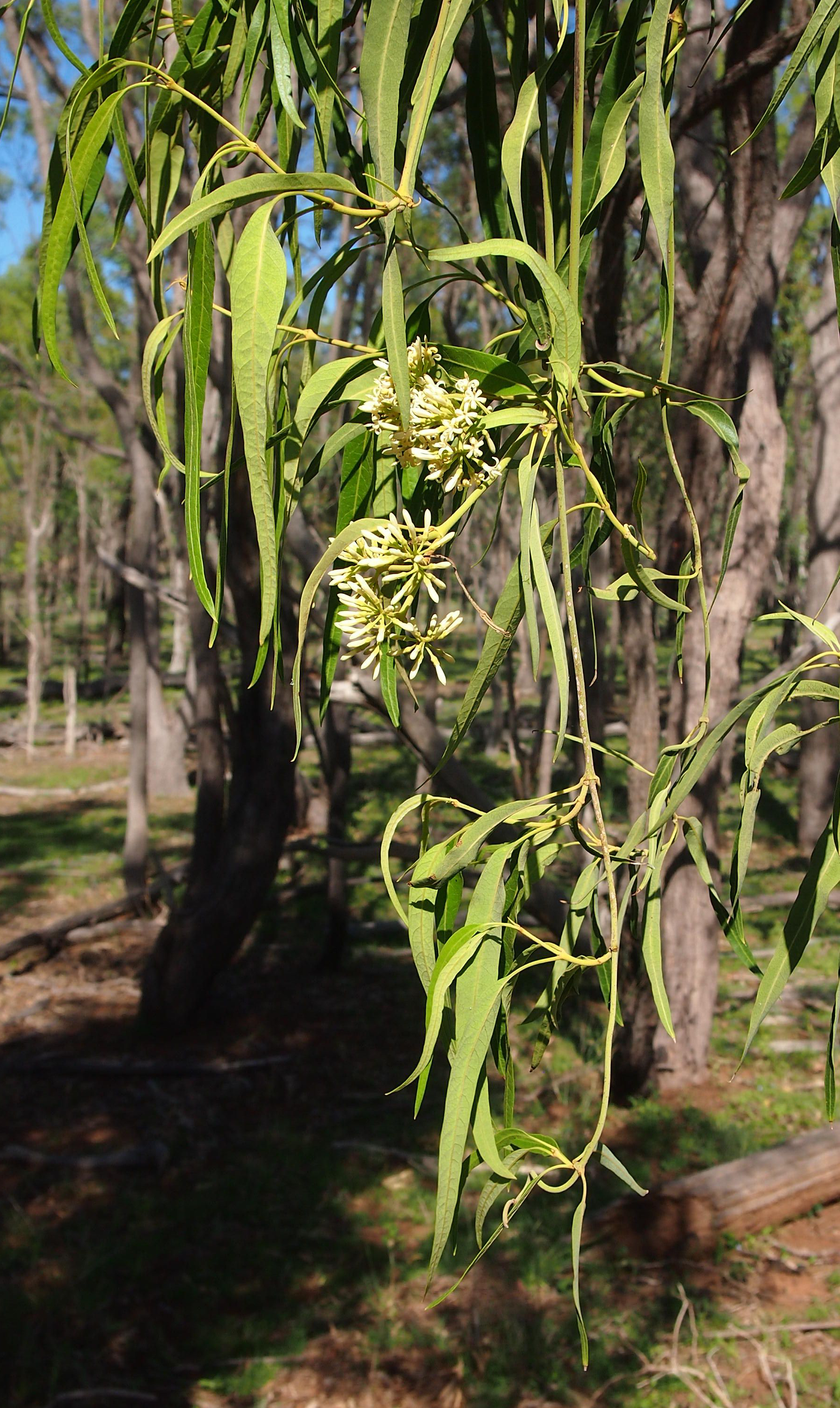

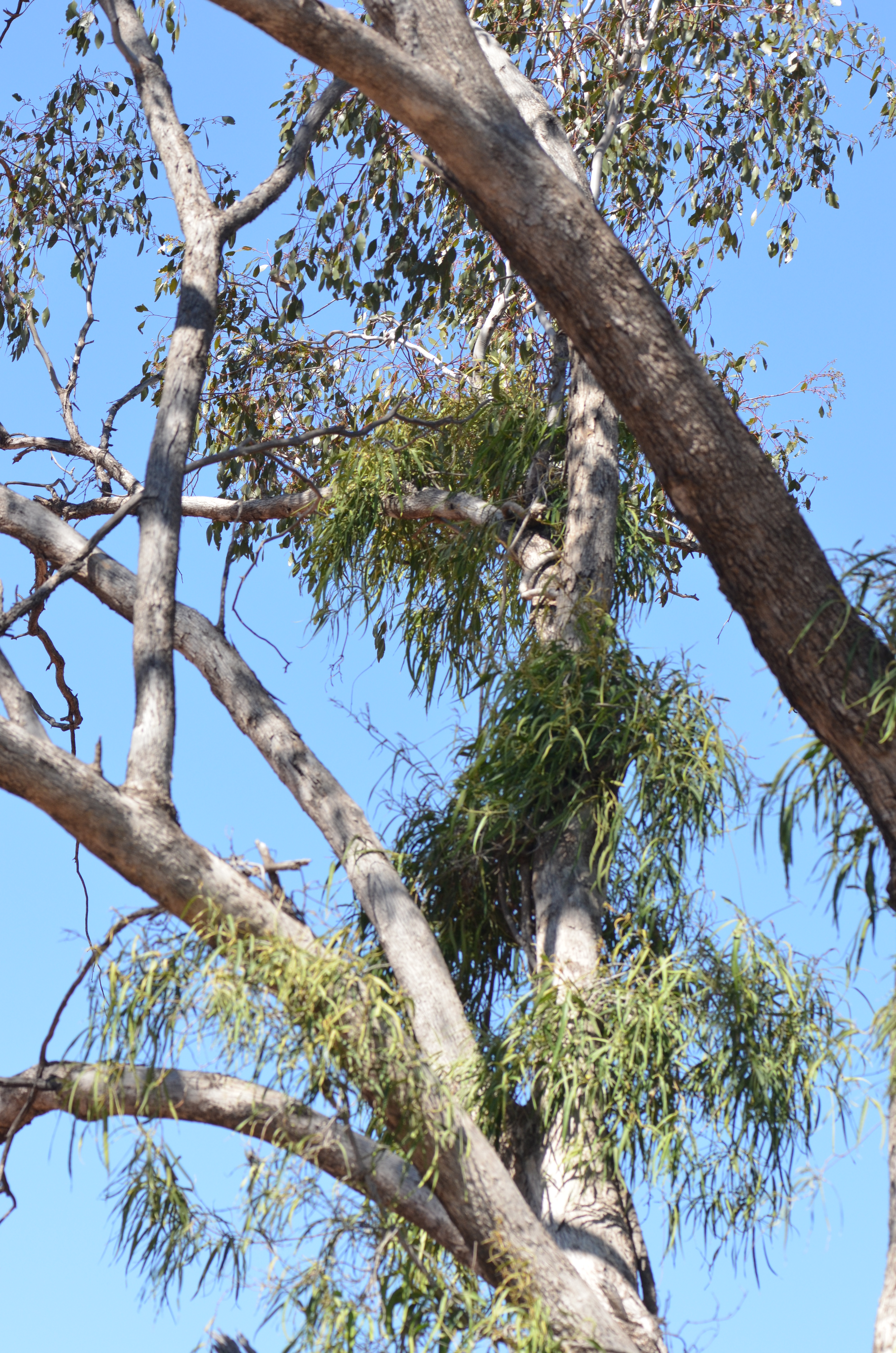

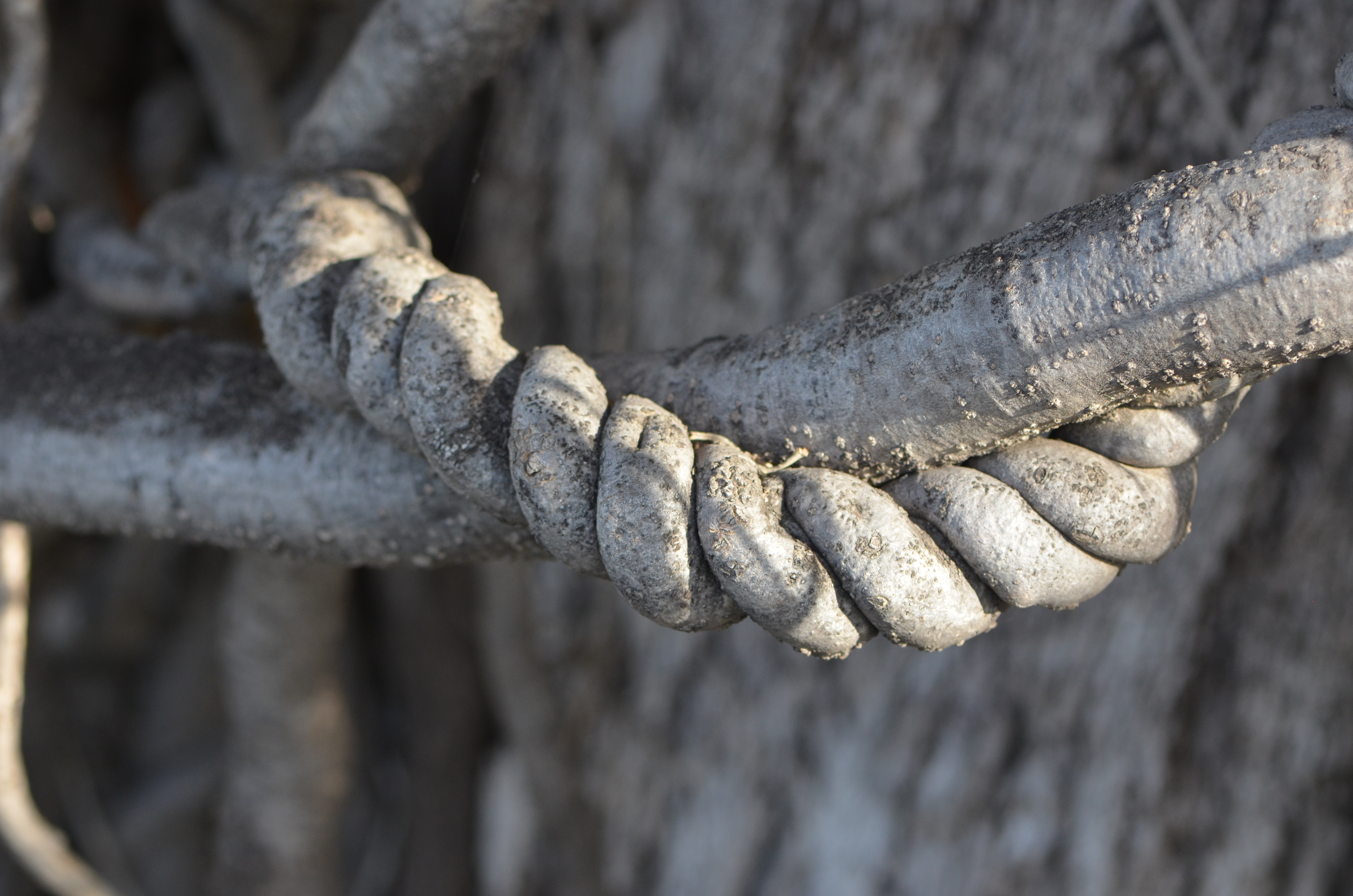

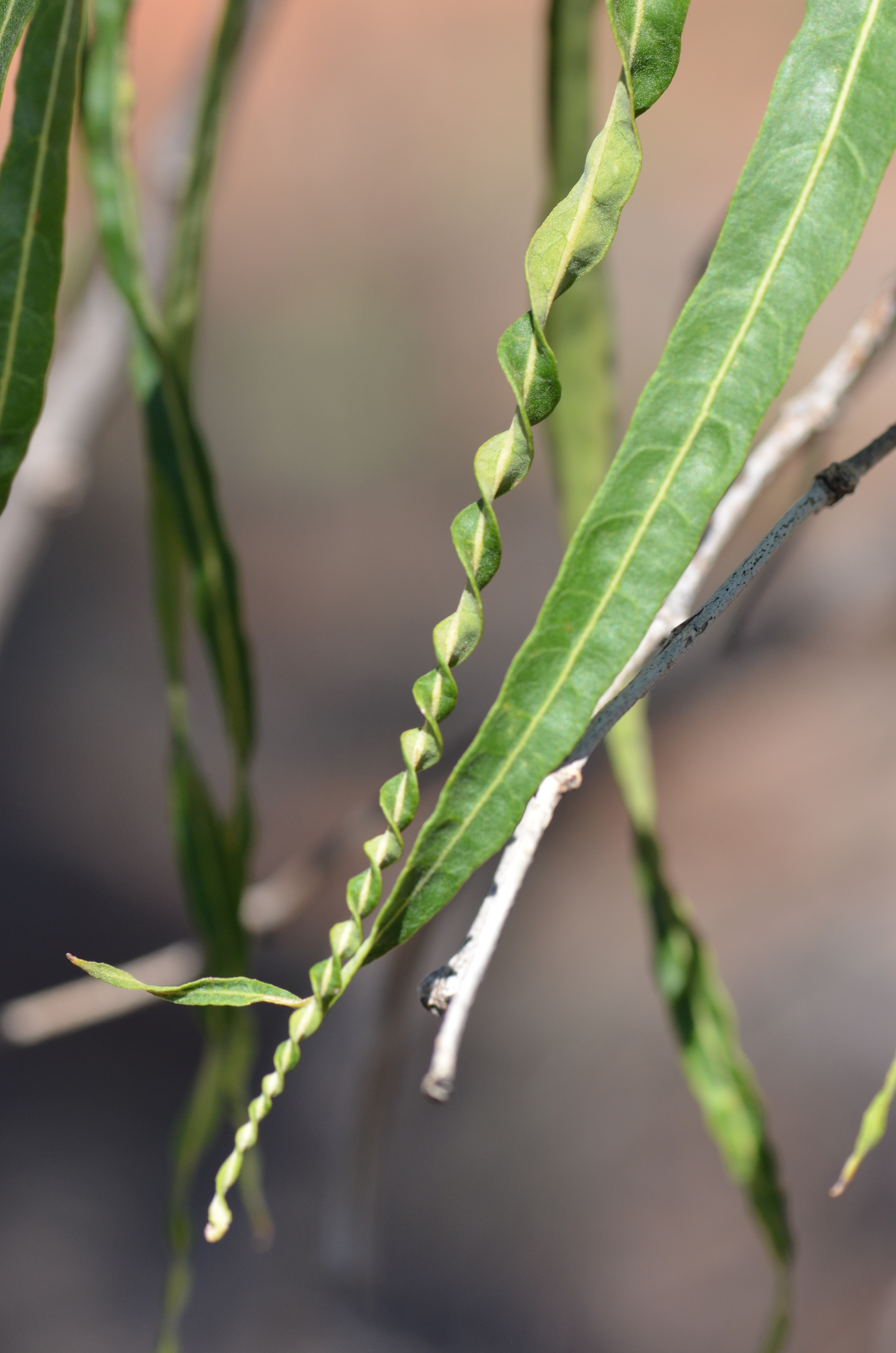

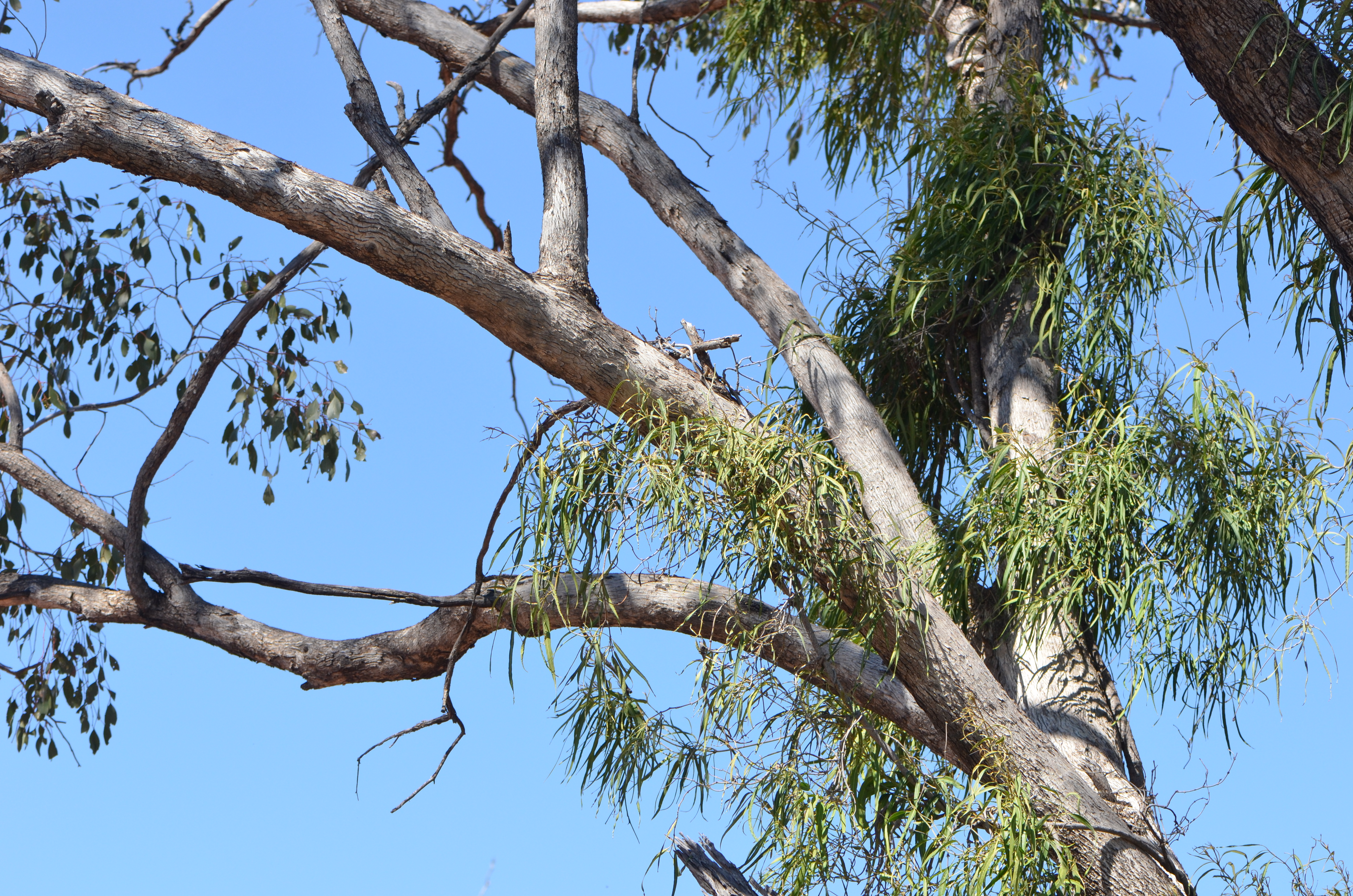

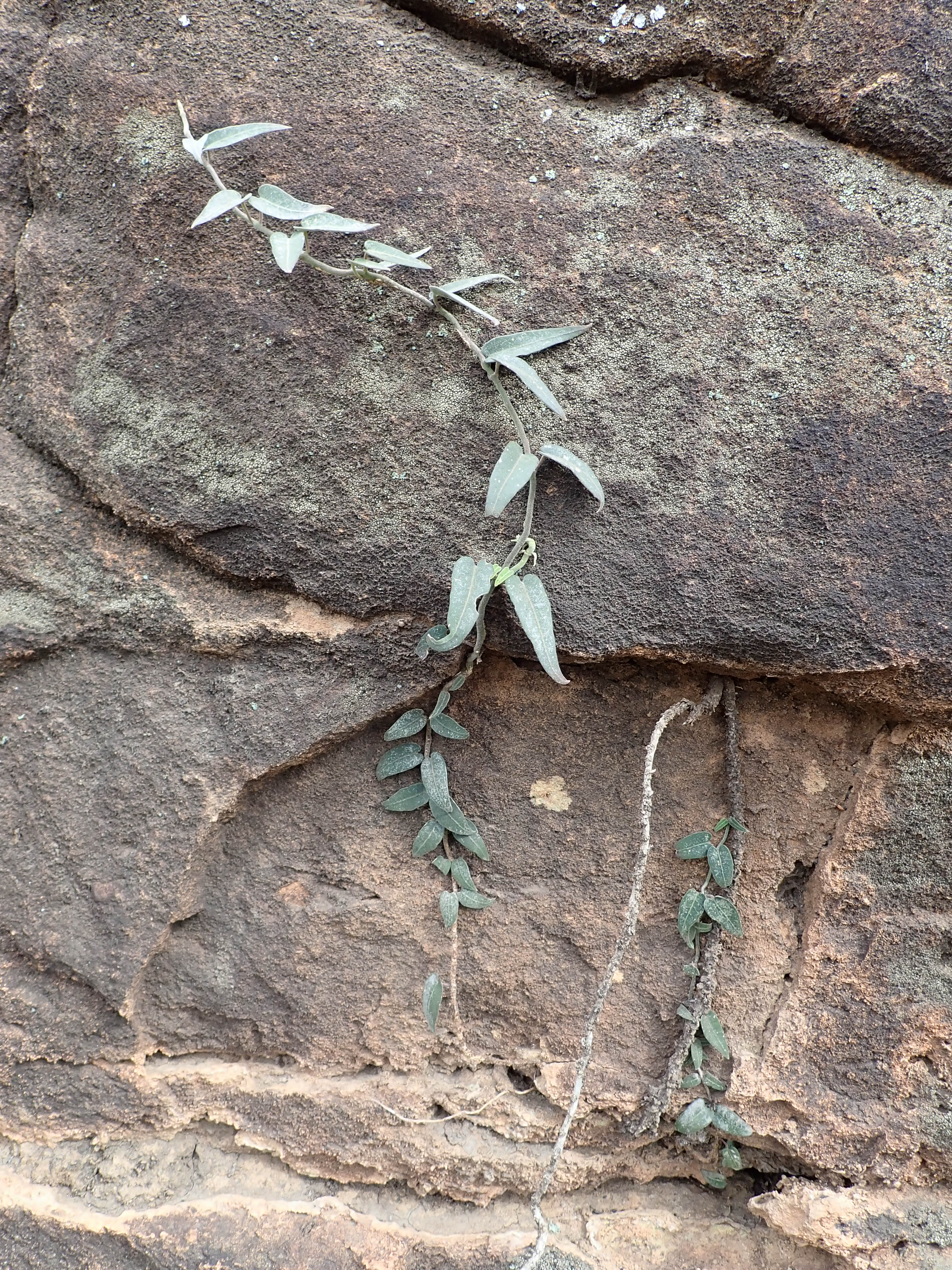

== Distribution and habitat ==
Parsonsia eucalyptophylla is native to New South Wales, Queensland and Victoria in Australia, and is widespread in woodland and scrub in inland areas.

== Taxonomy ==
Parsonsia eucalyptophylla was first described in 1861, by Ferdinand von Mueller, and later redescribed, in 1868, as Lyonsia eucalyptifolia by Bentham. Its currently accepted name is Parsonsia eucalyptophylla.
