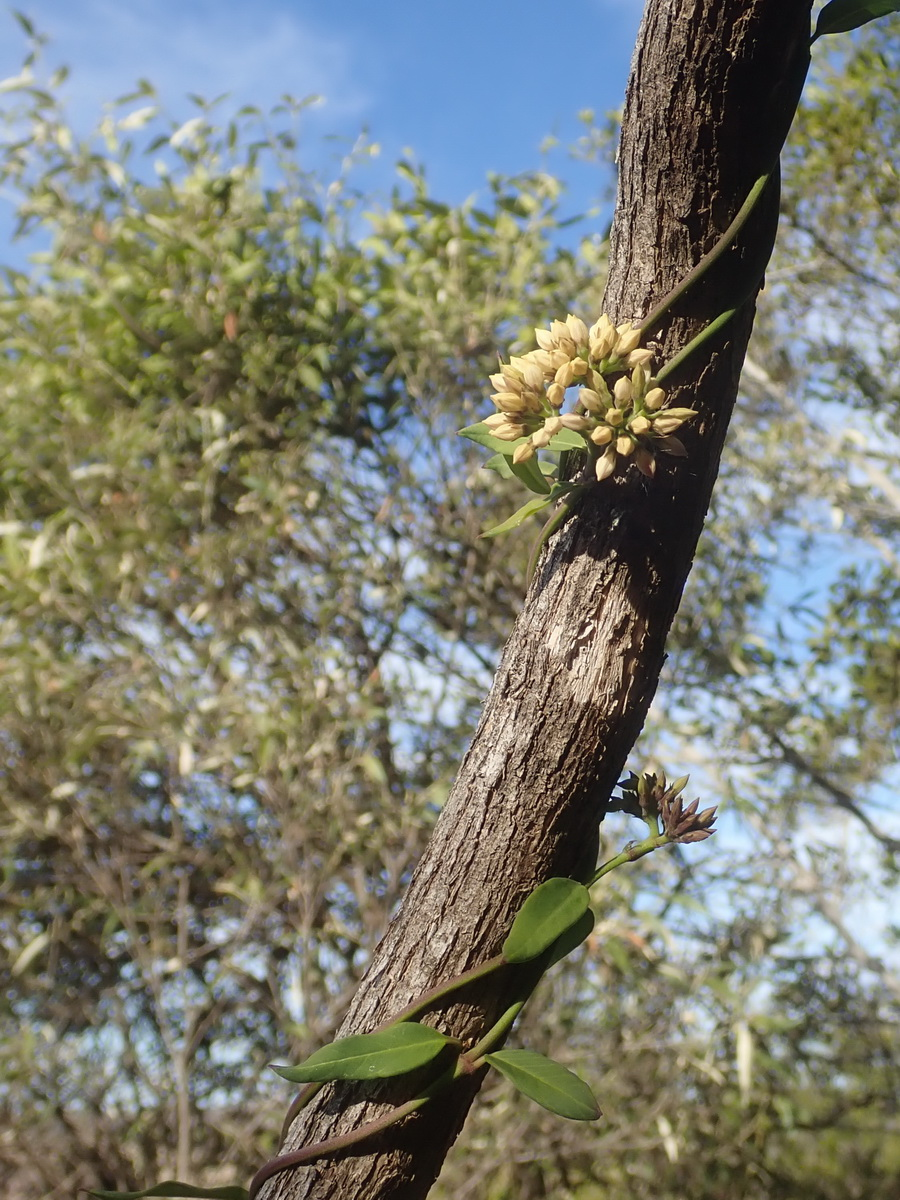

Scientific classification
- Kingdom: Plantae
- Clade: Embryophytes
- Clade: Tracheophytes
- Clade: Spermatophytes
- Clade: Angiosperms
- Clade: Eudicots
- Clade: Asterids
- Order: Gentianales
- Family: Apocynaceae
- Genus: Parsonsia
- Species: P. lanceolata

Binomial name
- Parsonsia lanceolata R.Br.
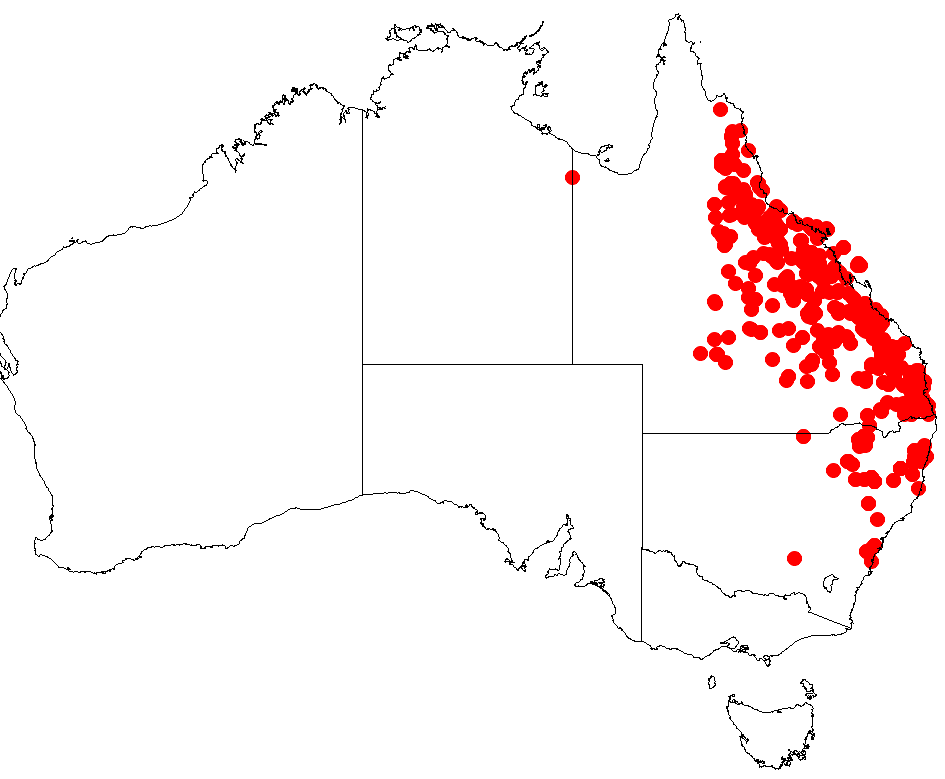

= Parsonsia lanceolata =

Species of plant

Parsonsia lanceolata, also known as the northern silkpod, is a widespread climbing plant in the family Apocynaceae. Occurring in dry rainforest and woodland in New South Wales and Queensland. Leaves are 3 to 10 cm long, 0.5 to 5 cm wide. Up to four metres in length, with a watery sap.
