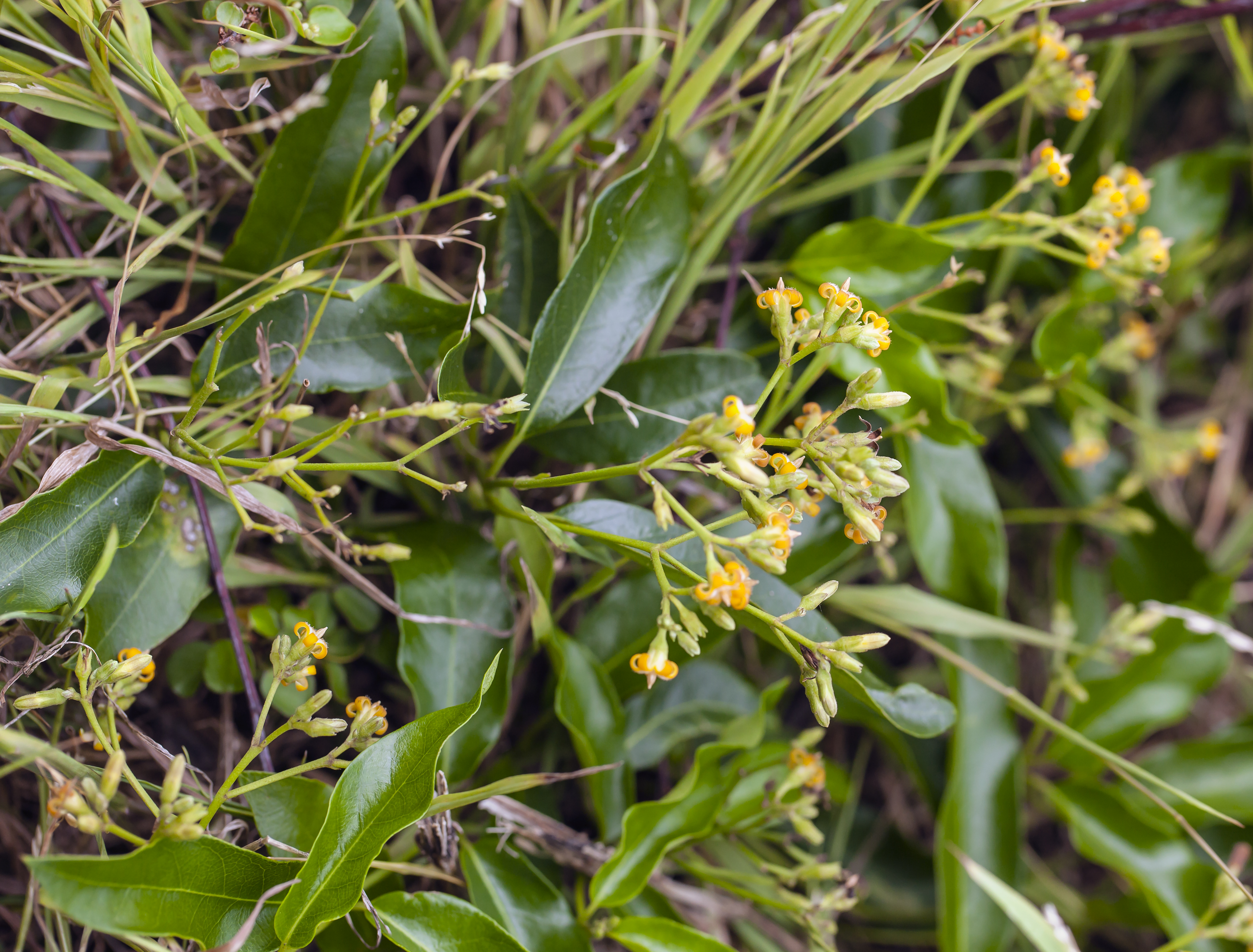

Scientific classification
- Kingdom: Plantae
- Clade: Tracheophytes
- Clade: Angiosperms
- Clade: Eudicots
- Clade: Asterids
- Order: Gentianales
- Family: Apocynaceae
- Genus: Parsonsia
- Species: P. howeana

Binomial name
- Parsonsia howeana J.B.Williams
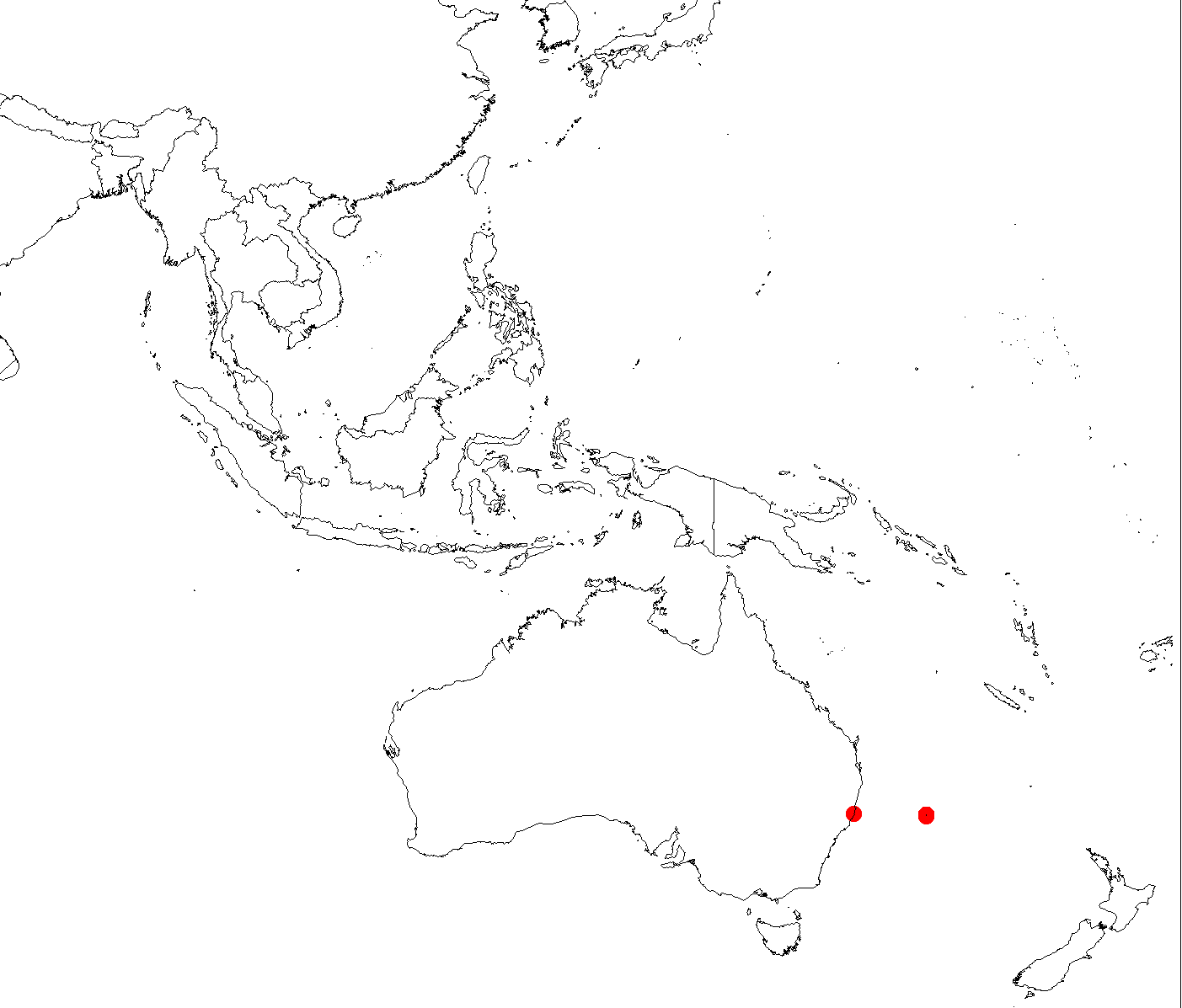
- Occurrence data from GBIF

Synonyms
- Parsonsia straminea var. glabrata Pichon

= Parsonsia howeana =

Species of plant

Parsonsia howeana is a vigorous twining vine of the family Apocynaceae. It is endemic to Australia’s subtropical Lord Howe Island in the Tasman Sea. It is common in the island's forests at low elevations.

== Description ==
The young stems of the vine are covered with fine hairs. The glossy, elliptical leaves are 4–9 cm long and 1.5–3 cm wide. The plant flowers throughout the year; the terminal or axillary inflorescences comprise clusters of orange to reddish-brown, sometimes yellowish, small honey-scented flowers. The ribbed, flattened, ellipsoidal seeds are 1.5 cm long.
