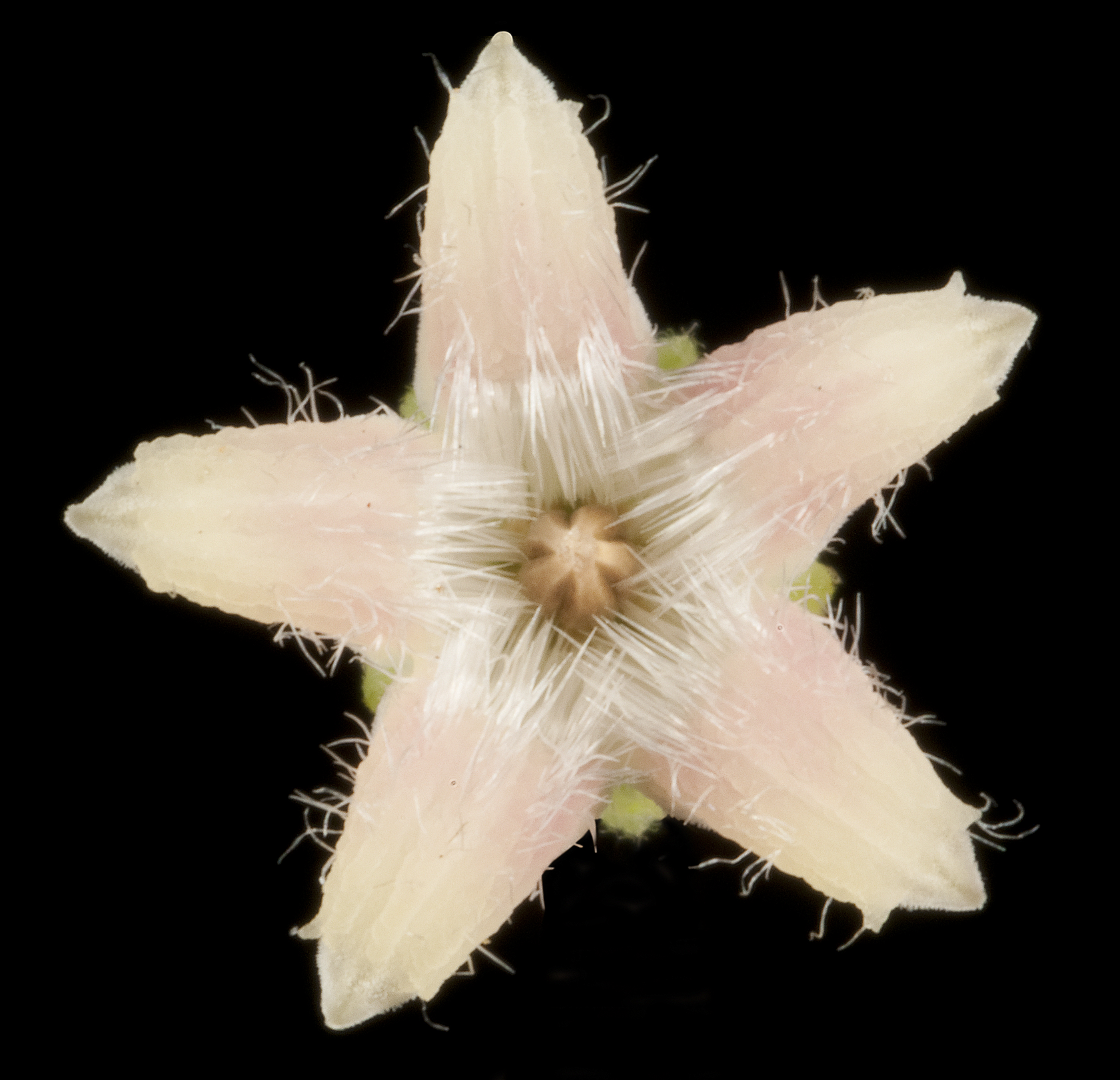

Conservation status
- Priority Four — Rare Taxa (DEC)

Scientific classification
- Kingdom: Plantae
- Clade: Tracheophytes
- Clade: Angiosperms
- Clade: Eudicots
- Clade: Asterids
- Order: Gentianales
- Family: Apocynaceae
- Genus: Parsonsia
- Species: P. diaphanophleba

Binomial name
- Parsonsia diaphanophleba F.Muell.

Synonyms
- Lyonsia diaphanophlebia Benth. Lyonsia diaphanophleba (F.Muell.) Benth.

= Parsonsia diaphanophleba =

Species of vine

Parsonsia diaphanophleba is a woody vine of the family Apocynaceae. It is found in Western Australia and is listed as a priority 4 (rare, threatened, or in need of monitoring) species.

== Description ==
Parsonsia diaphanophleba is a vine, whose woody stems can reach up to 10 m high, Flowering from January to February, April to June or September, its flowers are white/cream and pink.

== Distribution and habitat ==
Parsonsia diaphanophleba occurs in Jarrah forest on the Swan Coastal Plain in the southwest of Western Australia, growing on alluvial soils along rivers.

== Taxonomy ==
Parsonsia diaphanophleba was first described in 1861, by Ferdinand von Mueller, and later redescribed, in 1868, as Lyonsia diaphanophlebia by Bentham, who adjusted the Latin of the basionym (the earliest name) to Parsonsia diaphanophlebia. Its currently accepted name is Parsonsia diaphanophleba.
