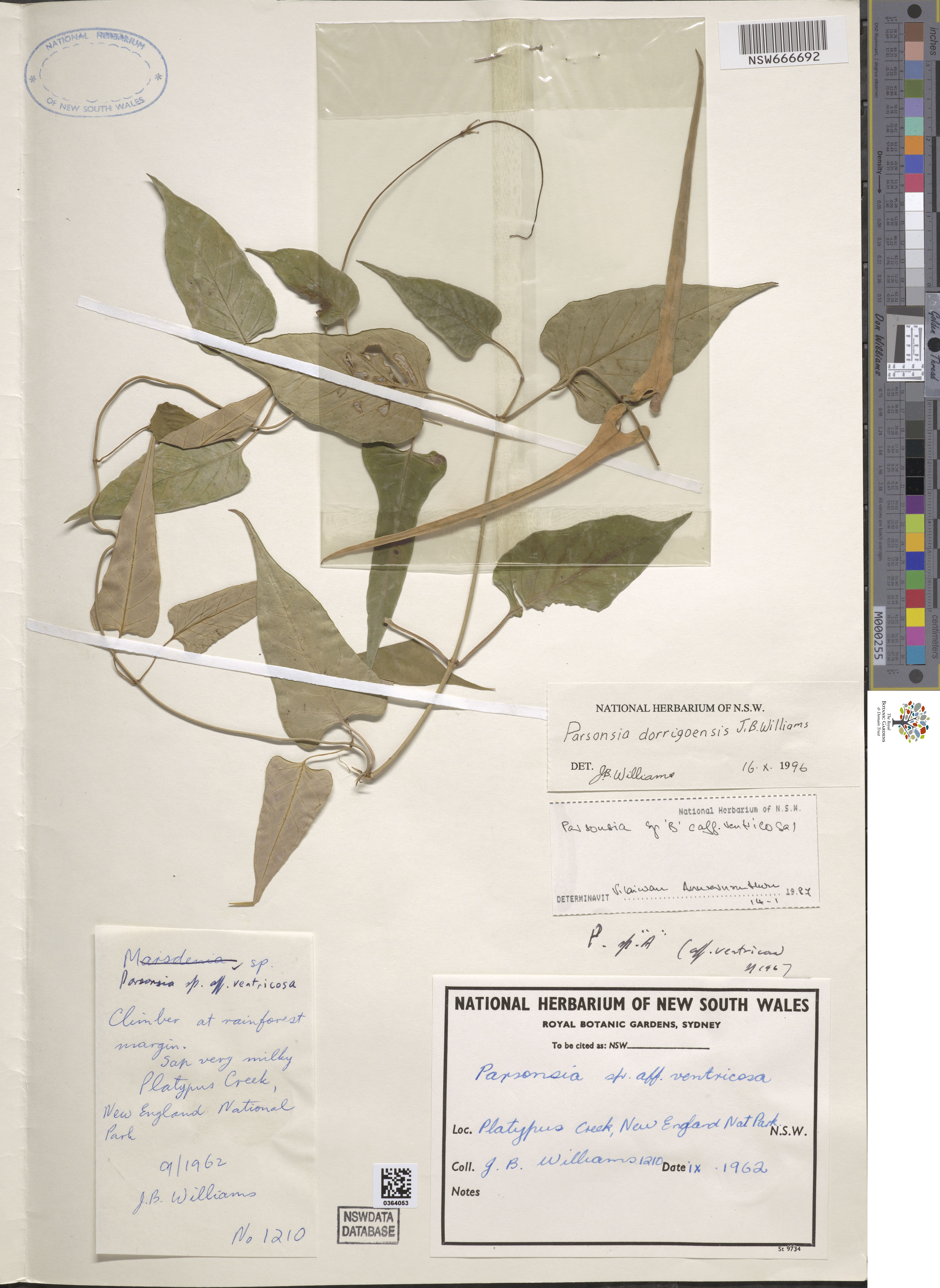
- Parsonsia dorrigoensis specimen

Scientific classification
- Kingdom: Plantae
- Clade: Tracheophytes
- Clade: Angiosperms
- Clade: Eudicots
- Clade: Asterids
- Order: Gentianales
- Family: Apocynaceae
- Genus: Parsonsia
- Species: P. dorrigoensis

Binomial name
- Parsonsia dorrigoensis J.B.Williams

= Parsonsia dorrigoensis =

Species of plant

Parsonsia dorrigoensis is a species of vine in the dogbane family Apocynaceae. It is endemic to New South Wales.

== Description ==
It is a climber, a woody vine capable of growing up to 6 metres in height. It has dry, dehiscent fruit as well as narrowly triangular or widely ovate leaves. It flowers from November to February with fruits recorded in January and February. The flowers are white cream or yellow orange. It grows as a perennial.

== Habitat and distribution ==
It grows in dry eucalypt woodlands as well as in subtropical and warm-temperate rainforests, usually in clay soils at altitudes ranging from 100 to 800 metres.

It can be found in scattered populations within north-east New South Wales, including in New England National Park and also within the localities of Woolgoolga, Urunga, Brinerville and Dorrigo. It is a rare species within its range.
