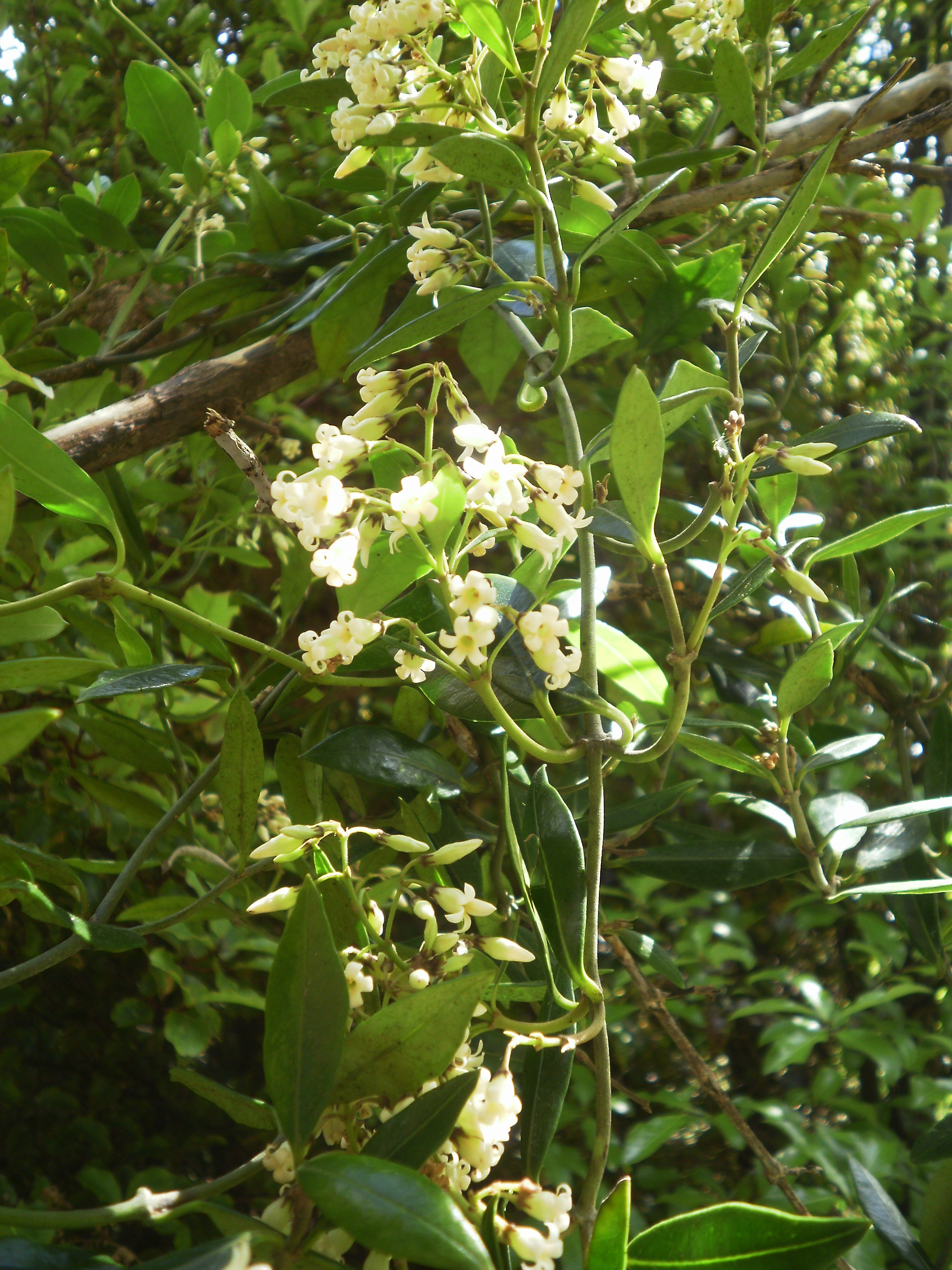
- Parsonsia heterophylla

Scientific classification
- Kingdom: Plantae
- Clade: Tracheophytes
- Clade: Angiosperms
- Clade: Eudicots
- Clade: Asterids
- Order: Gentianales
- Family: Apocynaceae
- Subfamily: Apocynoideae
- Tribe: Echiteae
- Genus: Parsonsia; R.Br.

Species
- See text
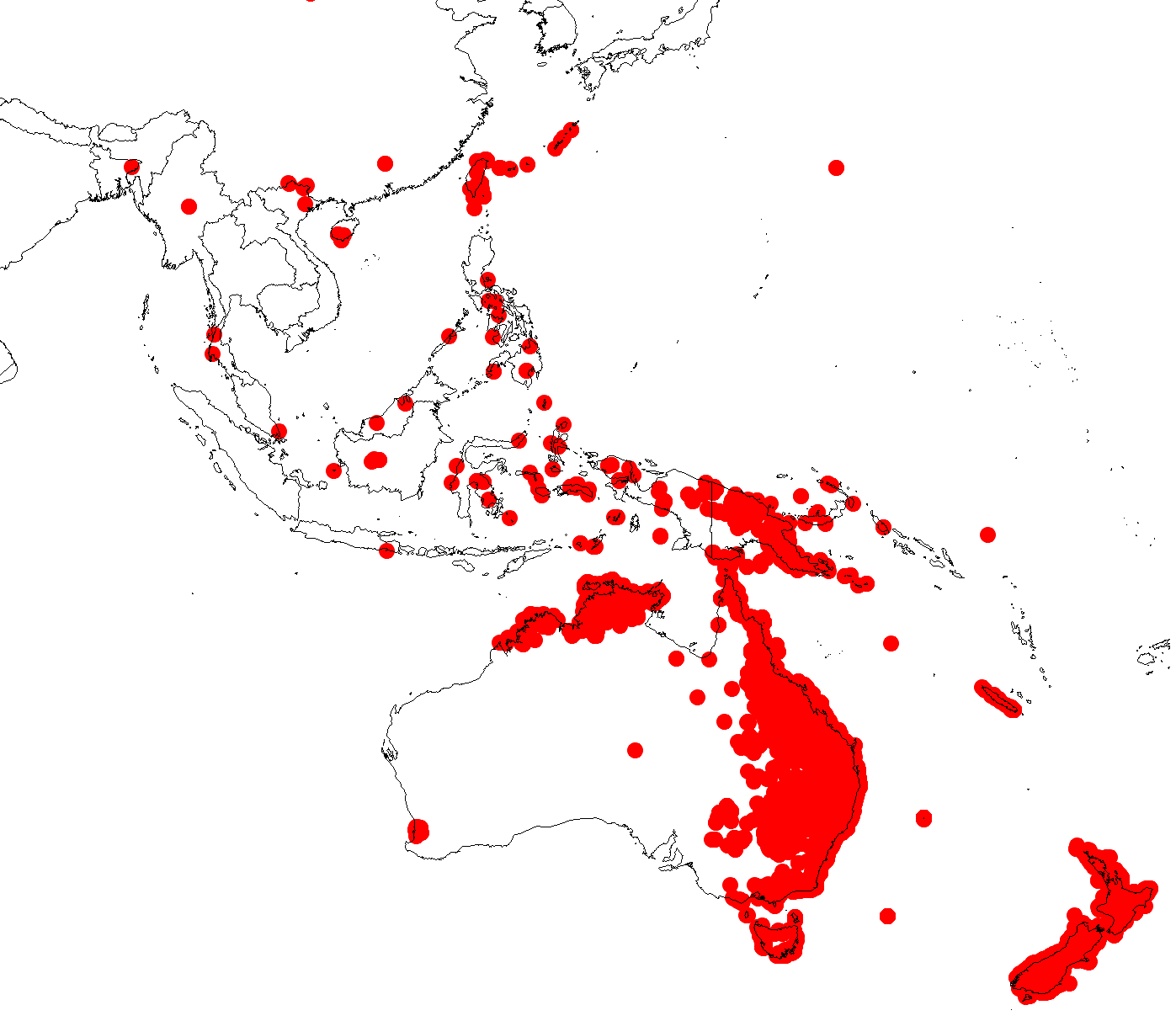
- Occurrence data for Parsonsia (GBIF)

Synonyms
- Chaetosus Benth.; Delphyodon K.Schum.; Gastranthus F.Muell.; Grisseea Bakh.f.; Helicandra Hook. & Arn.; Heligme Blume; Helyga Blume; Helygia Blume; Heylygia G.Don; Lyonsia R.Br.; Spirostemon Griff.

= Parsonsia =

Genus of flowering plants

Parsonsia is a genus of woody vines in the family Apocynaceae. Species occur throughout Indomalaya, Australasia and Melanesia.

== Description ==
The leaves are opposite, the shape and size of juvenile leaves often bearing little resemblance to the adult leaves. The latex may be clear and colourless, pale yellow or milky white. The flowers are green, white, cream, yellow, orange, red, pink or brown, sometimes with contrasting markings. These are followed by elongated pod-like capsules, the two follicles eventually separating to reveal numerous seeds with long, silky hairs.

== Taxonomy ==
The genus was named and described in 1810 by botanist Robert Brown in his paper On the Asclepiadeae published in Memoirs of the Wernerian Natural History Society . He named the genus in honour of James Parsons (1705–1770), an English physician and Fellow of the Royal Society.

The generic name Parsonsia R.Br. (1810) is conserved against the earlier homonym Parsonsia P.Browne which was given to a genus in the family Lythraceae. The latter genus is now included in Cuphea.

Parsonsia is closely related to Artia and Prestonia.

== Species ==
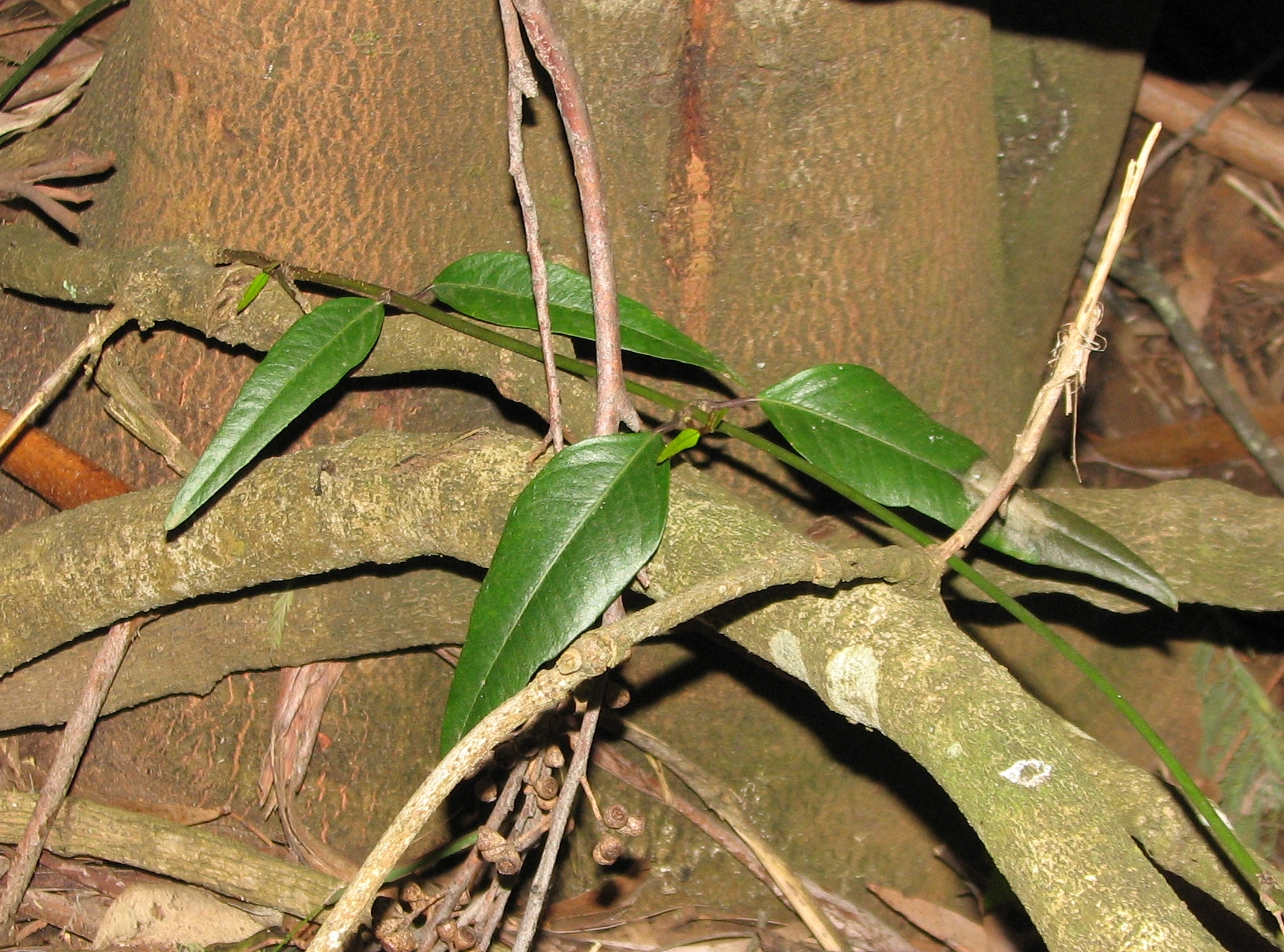
Parsonsia brownii

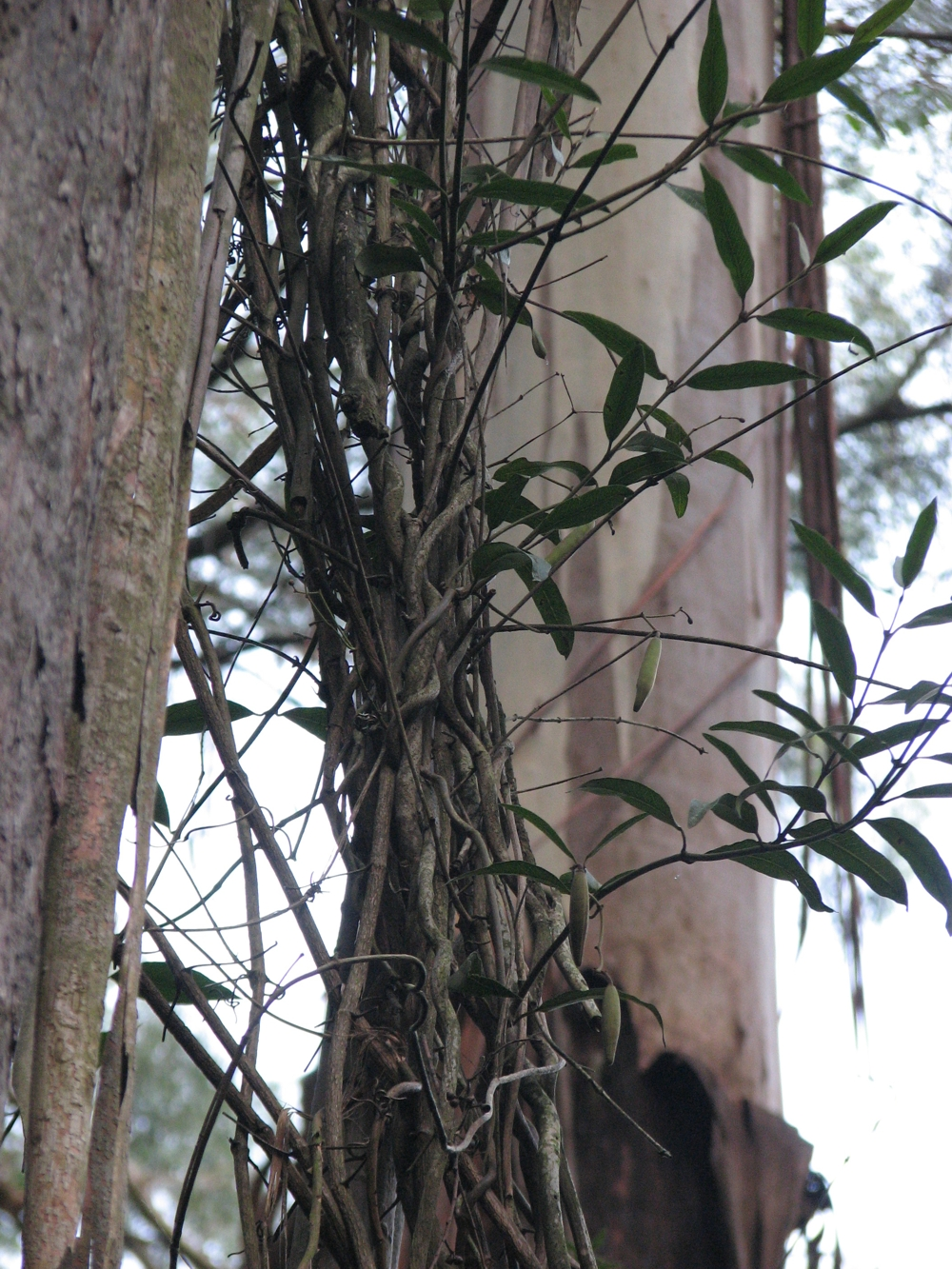
Parsonsia brownii

Accepted species

1. Parsonsia affinis Baill. – New Caledonia
2. Parsonsia alboflavescens (Dennst.) Mabb. – China, Taiwan, Japan, India, Sri Lanka, Indochina, Indonesia, Malaysia, Philippines and Australia.
3. Parsonsia apiculata D.J.Middleton
4. Parsonsia aneityensis Guillaumin – Vanuatu
5. Parsonsia apiculata (Bakh.f.) D.J.Middleton – Java, Bali
6. Parsonsia appressa D.J.Middleton – Papua New Guinea
7. Parsonsia bartlensis J.B.Williams – Queensland
8. Parsonsia blakeana J.B.Williams – Queensland
9. Parsonsia brachiata Baillon ex Guillaumin – New Caledonia
10. Parsonsia brisbanensis J.B.Williams – Queensland
11. Parsonsia brownii (Britten) Pichon – SE Australia
12. Parsonsia buruensis (Teijsm. & Binn.) Boerl. – Maluku, Papua New Guinea
13. Parsonsia capsularis (Forster f.) R. Br. – New Zealand
14. Parsonsia catalpicarpa – New Caledonia
15. Parsonsia celebica (Oliv.) Sleesen – W Malaysia, Borneo, Sulawesi
16. Parsonsia constricta D.J.Middleton – W New Guinea
17. Parsonsia crebriflora Baill. – New Caledonia
18. Parsonsia curvisepala K. Schum. – Perak, Sulawesi, New Guinea, Solomon Islands, Philippines
19. Parsonsia densiflora D.J.Middleton – Papua New Guinea
20. Parsonsia densivestita C.T.White – Queensland
21. Parsonsia diaphanophleba F.Muell. – Western Australia
22. Parsonsia dorrigoensis J.B.Williams – New South Wales
23. Parsonsia edulis (G. Benn.) Guillaumin – New Caledonia
24. Parsonsia effusa S. Moore – New Caledonia
25. Parsonsia eucalyptophylla F.Muell. – E Australia
26. Parsonsia ferruginea J.B.Williams – Queensland
27. Parsonsia flavescens Merr. & L.M. Perry – New Guinea
28. Parsonsia flexilis Baill. – New Caledonia
29. Parsonsia flexuosa Baill. – New Caledonia
30. Parsonsia franchetii Baill. ex Guillaumin – New Caledonia, Loyalty Islands
31. Parsonsia fulva S.T.Blake – Queensland, NSW
32. Parsonsia goniostemon Hand.-Mazz. – Guangxi
33. Parsonsia grandiflora D.J.Middleton – Bacan I in Maluku
34. Parsonsia grayana J.B.Williams – Queensland
35. Parsonsia hebetica Markgr. – Papua New Guinea
36. Parsonsia × heterocapsa Allan – New Zealand
37. Parsonsia heterophylla A. Cunn. – New Zealand
38. Parsonsia howeana J.B.Williams – Lord Howe Island
39. Parsonsia inae Guillaumin – Vanuatu
40. Parsonsia induplicata F.Muell. – Queensland, NSW
41. Parsonsia kimberleyensis J.B.Williams – Western Australia
42. Parsonsia kroombitensis J.B.Williams – Queensland
43. Parsonsia laevis – Fiji, Vanuatu
44. Parsonsia lanceolata R.Br. – Queensland, NSW
45. Parsonsia langiana F.Muell. – Queensland
46. Parsonsia larcomensis J.B.Williams – Queensland
47. Parsonsia largiflorens (F.Muell. ex Benth.) S.T.Blake – Queensland, NSW
48. Parsonsia lata Markgr.- Maluku, New Guinea, Solomon Is
49. Parsonsia latifolia (Benth.) S.T.Blake – Queensland
50. Parsonsia laxiflora Guillaumin – New Caledonia
51. Parsonsia leichhardtii F.Muell. – Queensland
52. Parsonsia lenticellata C.T.White – Queensland
53. Parsonsia lilacina F.Muell. – Queensland, NSW
54. Parsonsia longiflora Guillaumin – New Caledonia
55. Parsonsia longiloba D.J.Middleton – New Ireland
56. Parsonsia longipetiolata J.B.Williams – Queensland, NSW
57. Parsonsia macrophylla Pichon ex Guillaumin. – New Caledonia
58. Parsonsia marginata Markgr. – New Guinea
59. Parsonsia novoguinensis D.J.Middleton – New Guinea
60. Parsonsia oligantha (K.Schum.) D.J.Middleton – New Guinea
61. Parsonsia pachycarpa Guillaumin – New Caledonia
62. Parsonsia paulforsteri J.B.Williams – Queensland
63. Parsonsia pedunculata Markgr. – Bismarck Archipelago
64. Parsonsia penangiana King & Gamble – Penang, Thailand
65. Parsonsia philippinensis Merr. – Philippines, Java, Borneo, W Malaysia, Thailand
66. Parsonsia plaesiophylla S.T.Blake – Queensland
67. Parsonsia populifolia Baill. – New Caledonia
68. Parsonsia praeruptis Heads & P.J.de Lange – North I of New Zealand
69. Parsonsia purpurascens J.B.Williams – New South Wales
70. Parsonsia rotata Maiden & Betche – Queensland, NSW
71. Parsonsia rubra Kaneh. & Hatus. J. – Maluku, New Guinea
72. Parsonsia sanguinea Markgr. – New Guinea
73. Parsonsia sankowskyana J.B.Williams – Queensland
74. Parsonsia scabra (Labill.) Markgr. – New Caledonia
75. Parsonsia schoddei D.J.Middleton – Papua New Guinea
76. Parsonsia smithii Markgr. – Vanua Levu in Fiji
77. Parsonsia straminea (R.Br.) F.Muell. – Queensland, NSW
78. Parsonsia sundensis D.J.Middleton – East Timor
79. Parsonsia tenuiflora D.J.Middleton – W New Guinea
80. Parsonsia tenuis S.T.Blake – Queensland, NSW
81. Parsonsia terminaliifolia Guillaumin – New Caledonia
82. Parsonsia vaccinoides Markgr. – W New Guinea
83. Parsonsia velutina R.Br. – Timor, Maluku, Australia, New Guinea
84. Parsonsia ventricosa F.Muell. – Queensland, NSW
85. Parsonsia warenensis Kanehira & Hatusima – Papua New Guinea
86. Parsonsia wildensis J.B.Williams – Queensland
87. Parsonsia wongabelensis J.B.Williams- Queensland

formerly included

1. Parsonsia balansae Baill. = Artia balansae (Baill.) Pichon ex Guillaumin
2. Parsonsia barbata Blume = Parameria laevigata (Juss.) Moldenke
3. Parsonsia brachycarpa Baill. = Artia brachycarpa (Baill.) Boiteau
4. Parsonsia bracteata Hook. & Arn. = Mandevilla pentlandiana (DC.) Woodson
5. Parsonsia corymbosa (Jacq.) R.Br. ex Steud. = Pinochia corymbosa (Jacq.) M.E.Endress & B.F.Hansen
6. Parsonsia diversifolia (Warb.) Markgr. = Lyonsia diversifolia Warb.
7. Parsonsia floribunda (Sw.) R.Br. ex Steud. = Pinochia floribunda (Sw.) M.E.Endress & B.F.Hansen
8. Parsonsia francii Guillaumin = Artia francii (Guillaumin) Pichon
9. Parsonsia galeottiana Baill. = Thenardia galeottiana Baill.
10. Parsonsia javanica Blume 1826 not (Blume) K. Schum 1895 = Urceola javanica (Blume) Boerl.
11. Parsonsia leptocarpa Hook. & Arn. = Forsteronia leptocarpa (Hook. & Arn.) A.DC.
12. Parsonsia lifuana Baill. = Artia lifuana (Baill.) Pichon ex Guillaumin
13. Parsonsia myrtifolia (Poir.) Roem. & Schult. = Landolphia myrtifolia (Poir.) Markgr.
14. Parsonsia ovata Wall. ex G.Don = Pottsia laxiflora (Blume) Kuntze
15. Parsonsia spicata (Jacq.) R.Br. ex Steud. = Forsteronia spicata (Jacq.) G.Mey.

== Cultivation ==
A species from New Zealand, Parsonsia variablis (Variable-leaved Parsonsia), was introduced into cultivation in England in 1847 as a greenhouse plant and was noted to have a sweet scent, however the flowers were regarded as "not very showy". This species is thought to be a form of Parsonsia heterophylla.
