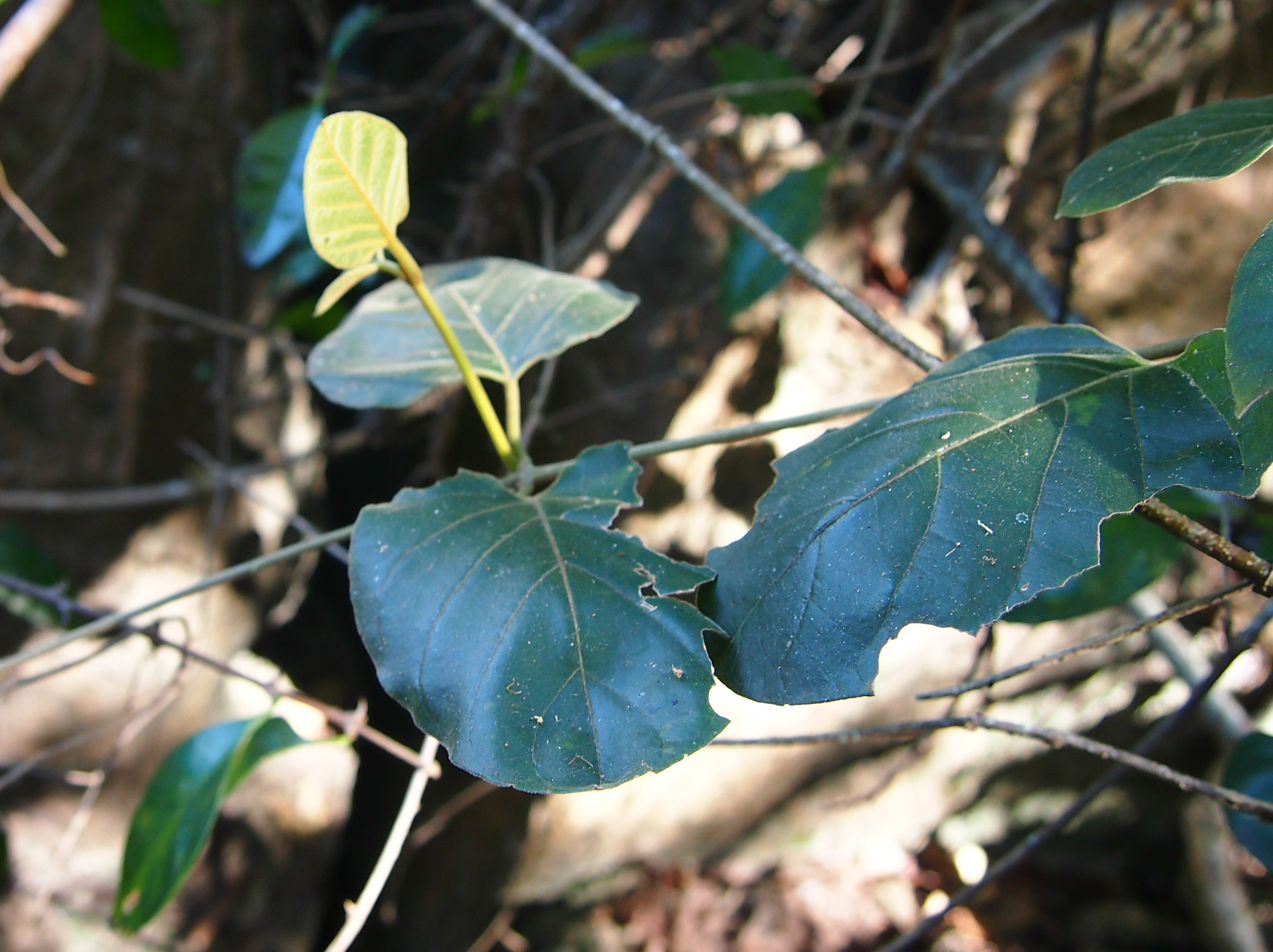
- Parsonsia velutina foliage
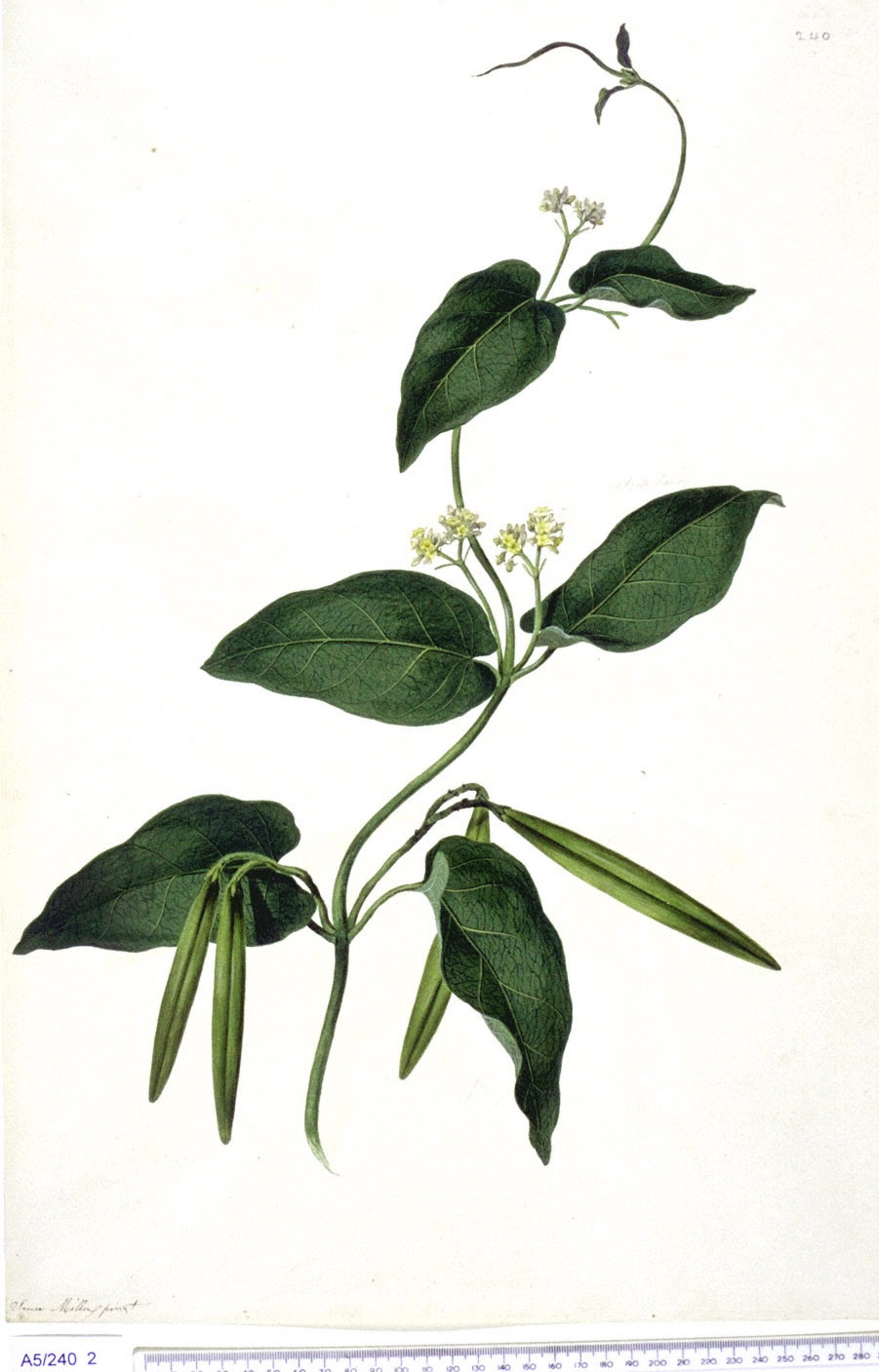

Scientific classification
- Kingdom: Plantae
- Clade: Tracheophytes
- Clade: Angiosperms
- Clade: Eudicots
- Clade: Asterids
- Order: Gentianales
- Family: Apocynaceae
- Genus: Parsonsia
- Species: P. velutina

Binomial name
- Parsonsia velutina R.Br.
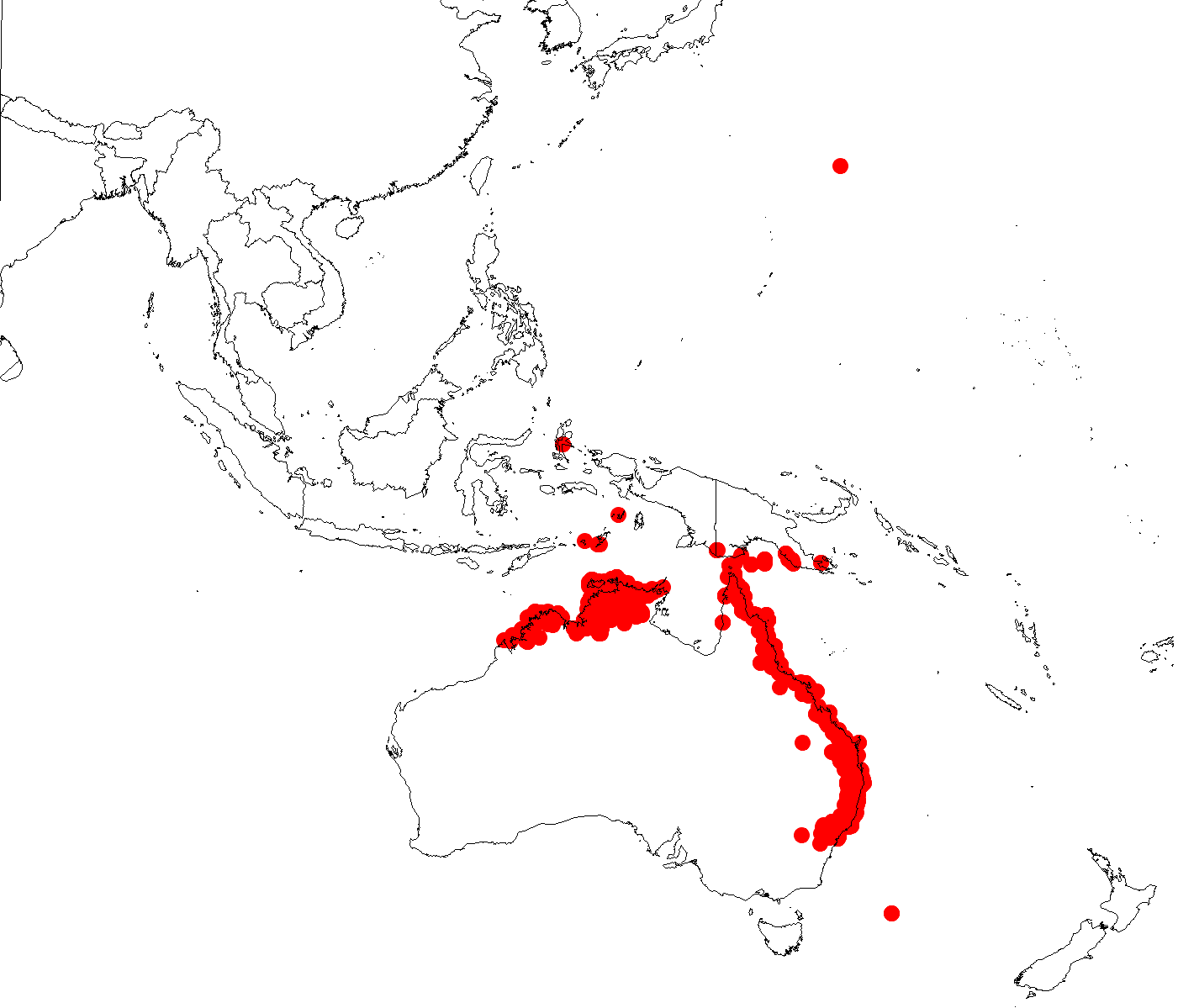
- Occurrence data from GBIF

= Parsonsia velutina =

Species of plant

Parsonsia velutina, the hairy silkpod, is a woody vine of the family Apocynaceae. It occurs in monsoon forest in New Guinea and across northern and eastern Australia, from The Kimberley, across the Top End to Cape York and south to central New South Wales.

== Description ==
The species produces slender stems, less than to 20 mm diameter, and is dependent upon climbing over rock faces or other plants to reach sunlight. The stems may produce a watery sap when damaged. The broad, opposite leaves are clothed in brown hairs, giving rise to the common name.

Small, yellow and brown flowers are followed by long, slender pods which are 7 to 10 centimetres in length.
