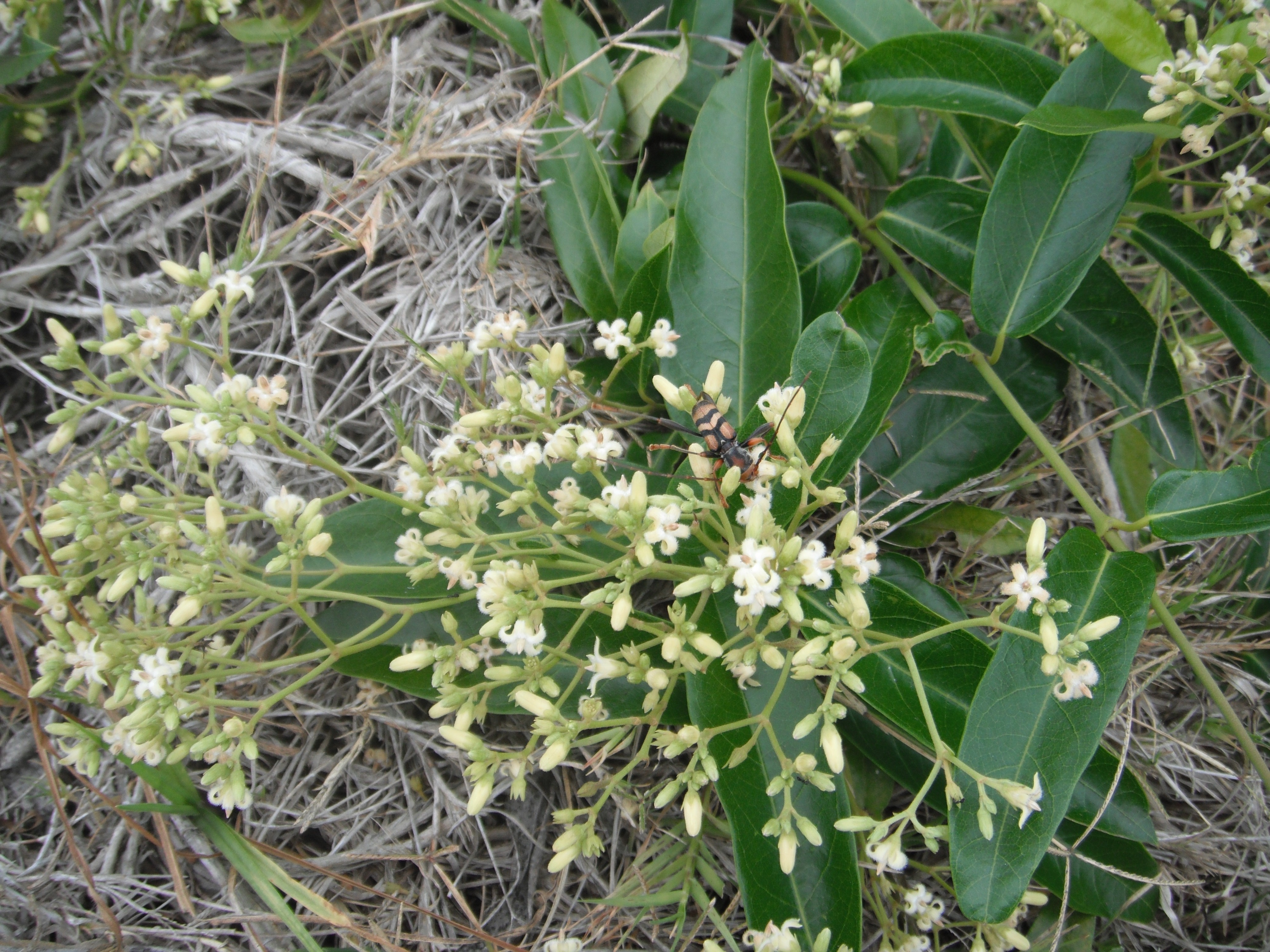
- Common silkpod
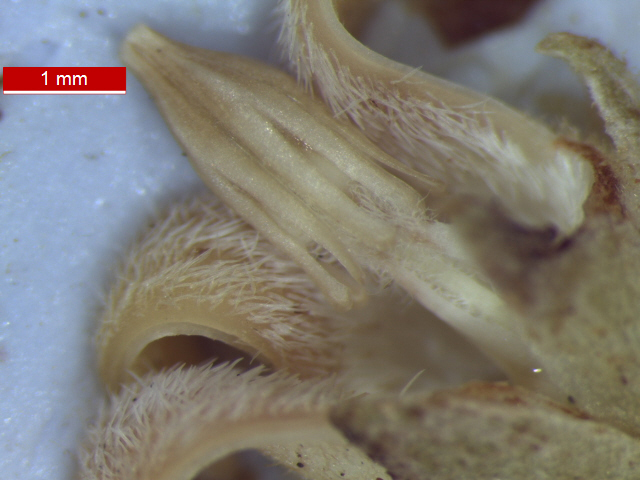
- Close-up of the flower

Scientific classification
- Kingdom: Plantae
- Clade: Tracheophytes
- Clade: Angiosperms
- Clade: Eudicots
- Clade: Asterids
- Order: Gentianales
- Family: Apocynaceae
- Genus: Parsonsia
- Species: P. straminea

Binomial name
- Parsonsia straminea (R.Br.) F.Muell.
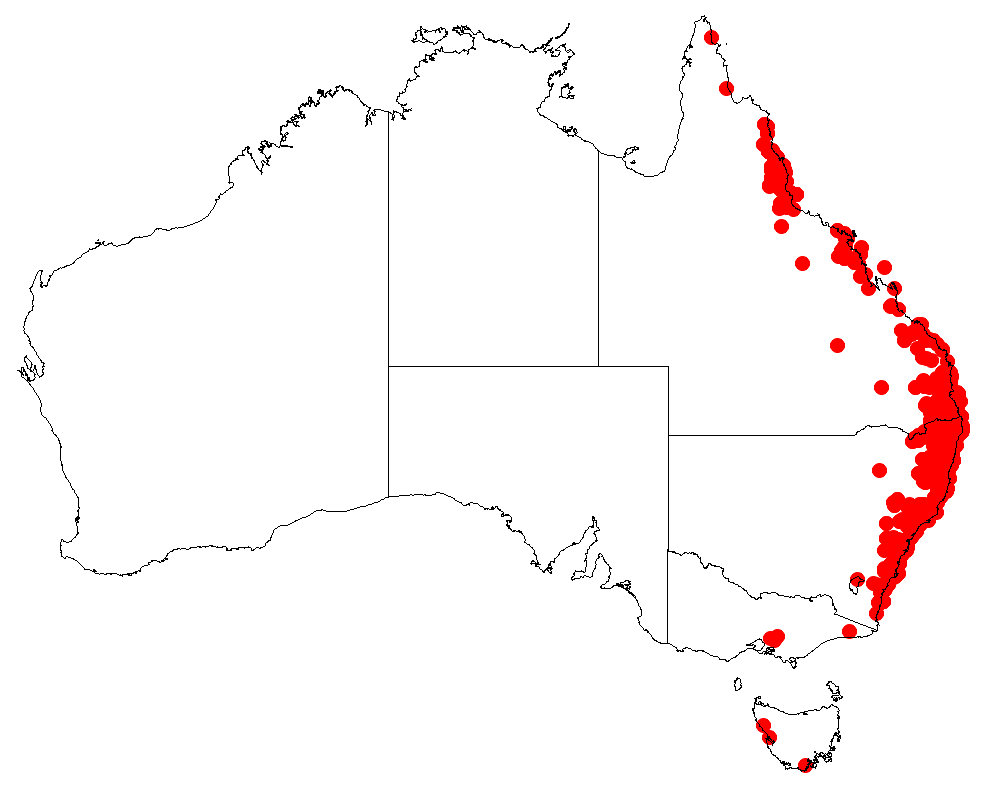
- Occurrence data from AVH

Synonyms
- Lyonsia straminea R.Br.; Lyonsia reticulata F.Muell.; Parsonsia reticulata (F.Muell.) F.Muell.

= Parsonsia straminea =

Species of vine

Parsonsia straminea, commonly known as common silkpod or monkey rope, is a woody vine of the dogbane family, Apocynaceae. It occurs in the states of New South Wales and Queensland in Australia.

== Taxonomy ==
Prolific botanist Robert Brown collected the species between October and November 1804 from the Hunter and Williams Rivers in New South Wales. He described the species as Lyonsia straminea in his 1810 work Prodromus Florae Novae Hollandiae et Insulae Van Diemen. Brown noted that it was closely related to Parsonsia, differing only in the structure of the capsule. The genus name commemorated mathematician and botanist Israel Lyons, who had published a survey of Cambridge flora. The species name straminea is Latin for "straw-coloured". Ferdinand von Mueller reclassified it in Parsonsia in 1868.

== Description ==
Parsonsia straminea is a vine, whose woody stems can reach 9 cm (3 1/2 in) in diameter, and extend for 20 m (66 ft) into the tree canopy. The species climbs by twining, aided by its adventitious roots. The plant exudes a clear pale brown sap when cut or damaged. The leathery adult leaves are arranged oppositely (arising in pairs) along the stems and are yellowish green on their upper surface and pale grey-green (glaucous) on the undersurface. They are 4–24 cm (1 5/8–9 1/2 in) long by 1.5–8 cm (5/8–3 1/8 in) wide—generally larger if growing in more shade—and elliptic to oblong-ovate in shape, with a round or heart-shaped (cordate) base. The fragrant pale yellow flowers are produced in panicles from November to June, peaking over February. These are followed by slender pods which are 10–20 cm (4–8 in) in length, which split to release the seed from September to December. The feathery seeds are carried by the wind and dispersed.

== Distribution and habitat ==
Parsonsia straminea occurs along Australia's east coast, from northeastern Queensland south to southern New South Wales as far south as Mount Gulaga. It grows in shady spots in rainforest and rainforest margins, as well as floodplains, on fertile basalt- and sandstone-based soils.

== Ecology ==
Parsonsia straminea is foraged upon by caterpillars of the common crow (Euploea core) and the Cairns hamadryad (Tellervo zoilus subsp. zoilus).

== Cultivation ==
Parsonsia straminea can grow in a range of soil types and aspects. It can be used to cover fences and screens, though could smother nearby plants. It can be propagated by cuttings or layering.
