= Elmer =

Elmer is a name of Germanic British origin. The given name originated as a surname, a medieval variant of the given name Aylmer, derived from Old English æþel (noble) and mær (famous). Originally, a job like a smith, Elmers were wood workers or carpenters. By providing furniture for castles, and during wartime, bow, arrows and catapult/trebuchet making. It was adopted as a given name in the United States, "in honor of the popularity of the brothers Ebenezer and Jonathan Elmer, leading supporters of the American Revolution". The name has declined in popularity since the first decades of the 20th century and fell out of the top 1,000 names used for American boys in 2009. However, it continues in use for newborn boys in the United States, where 167 boys born there in 2022 received the name. The name is common in the United States and Canada. Elmar, a variant, was among the 10 most popular names for newborn boys in Iceland in 2021.

Notable people with the name include:

== Mononym ==
- Eilmer of Malmesbury (or Elmer), 11th-century English Benedictine monk
- Elmer (rapper), Dutch rapper Merel Pauw
- In North American amateur radio subculture, an Elmer is a mentor to a newcoming amateur radio operator

== Given name ==
- Elmer L. Andersen (1909–2004), American businessman, philanthropist, and the 30th governor of Minnesota
- Elmer Austin (1949–2023), American basketball player
- Elmer Batters (1919–1997), American fetish photographer
- Elmer Bernstein (1922–2004), American composer
- Elmer Bischoff (1916–1991), American painter
- Elmer Bowman (1897–1985), American baseball player
- W. Elmer Brandon (1906–1956), Canadian politician, known by his middle name
- Elmer Chambers (1897–1952), American jazz trumpeter
- Elmer Davis (1890–1958), American news reporter, author, director of the United States Office of War Information during World War II
- Elmer Dessens (born 1971), major league baseball relief pitcher
- Elmer Diktonius (1896–1961), Finnish writer and composer
- Elmer E. Ellsworth (1837–1861), lawyer and soldier, and the first conspicuous casualty of the American Civil War
- Elmer Flick (1876–1971), American hall-of-fame baseball player
- Elemér Gorondy-Novák (1885–1954), Hungarian military officer, commander of the Hungarian Third Army during the Second World War
- Elmer Gedeon (1917–1944), American baseball player
- Elmer Grey (1872–1963), American architect and artist
- Elmer E. Hall (1890–1958), brigadier general in the United States Marine Corps
- Elmer Beseler Harris (1939–2019), American businessman and politician
- Elmer Cameron Hawley (1905–1969), American novelist
- Elmer Keith (1899–1984), American firearms cartridge designer and author
- Elmer Keeton (1882–1947), born as William Elmer Keeton, American musician, community leader
- Elmer Kelton (1926–2009), American journalist and writer, particularly of Western novels
- Elmer Lach (1918–2015), Canadian ice hockey player
- Elmer Layden (1903–1973), commissioner of the National Football League and head football coach at the University of Notre Dame
- Elmer Lowry (1919–1989), American actor and vaudevillian
- Elmer MacKay (born 1936), Canadian politician
- Elmer McCurdy (1880–1911), American outlaw whose corpse was put on exhibit
- Elmer Drew Merrill (1876–1956), American botanist
- Elmer Møller (born 2003), Danish tennis player
- Elmer "Geronimo" Pratt (1947–2011), Vietnam veteran and high-ranking member of the Black Panther Party
- Elmer Rees (1941–2019), Welsh mathematician
- Elmer Rice (1892–1967), American playwright
- Elmer Riddle (1914–1984), baseball player for the Cincinnati Reds
- Elmer Snowden (1900–1973), American jazz musician
- Elmer Söderblom (born 2001), Swedish ice hockey player
- Elmer Ambrose Sperry (1860–1930), American inventor and entrepreneur
- Elmer Steele (1886–1966), American baseball player
- Elmer Valo (1921–1998), major league baseball player, coach, and scout
- Uncle Elmer (1937–1992), American wrestler, born Stanley Frazier

== Surname ==
- Adolph D. E. Elmer (1870–1942), American botanist whose standard author abbreviation is Elmer
- Birger Elmér (1919–1999), Swedish military and intelligence officer, head of the Swedish secret intelligence agency, known as IB (1965–1975)
- Charles Elmer (1872–1954), American amateur astronomer, co-founder of the Perkin-Elmer optical company
- Ebenezer Elmer (1752–1843), American politician and physician from New Jersey
- Edwin Romanzo Elmer (1850–1923), American painter
- Emma Osterman Elmer (1867–1956), American librarian and author
- Greg Elmer (born 1967), British-born Professor of Professional Communication at Ryerson University
- James Elmer (born 1971), Australian Olympic field hockey striker
- James C. Elmer (1882–1920), American college football player
- John Elmer (footballer) (1905–1993), Australian rules footballer
- Jonas Elmer (director) (born 1966), Danish film director, screenwriter and actor
- Jonas Elmer (born 1988), Swiss footballer
- Jonathan Elmer (1745–1817), American politician from New Jersey
- Kenneth Elmer (born 1948), Canadian Olympic middle-distance runner
- Lachlan Elmer (born 1969), Australian Olympic field hockey player
- Lucius Elmer (1793–1883), American politician from New Jersey
- Owen Elmer (1938–2023), American politician from Nebraska
- Philip Elmer-DeWitt (born 1949), American computer journalist
- Rico Elmer (born 1969), Swiss ski mountaineer and mountain runner
- Rachael Robinson Elmer (1878–1919), American painter
- Rudolf Elmer, Swiss banker, whistleblower who released documents about Swiss bank Julius Bär
- Stephen Elmer (baptised 1715–1796), English painter
- Terri-Rae Elmer (born 1956), Los Angeles radio broadcaster
- Wally Elmer (1898–1978), Canadian ice hockey player
- William Elmer (1869–1945), American silent film actor
- William P. Elmer (1871–1956), American politician from Missouri

== Fictional characters ==
- Elmer the Patchwork Elephant, the title character in a series of children's picture books by David McKee
- Elmer the Great Dane, the pet dog of Oswald the Lucky Rabbit
- Elmer, a comic book by Gerry Alanguilan
- Elmer, a fictional bull, "husband" of Elsie the Cow, namesake of Elmer's Glue
- Elmer Fudd, a Looney Tunes character
- Elmer Elephant, the titular character of a Disney Silly Symphonies short
- Elmer Gantry, the title character in a novel by Sinclair Lewis

== See also ==
- Aylmer, a surname
