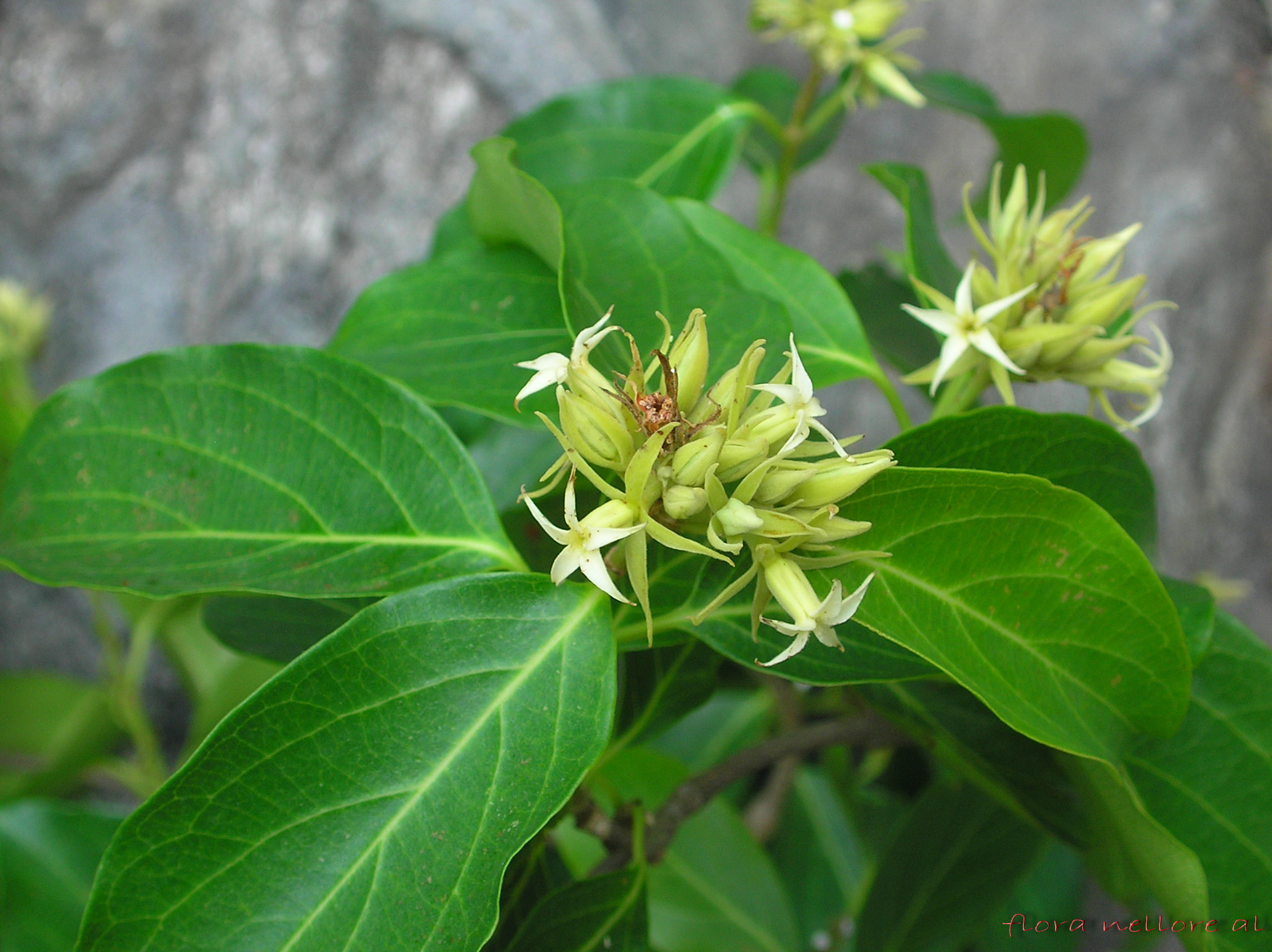
- Aganosma cymosa

Scientific classification
- Kingdom: Plantae
- Clade: Tracheophytes
- Clade: Angiosperms
- Clade: Eudicots
- Clade: Asterids
- Order: Gentianales
- Family: Apocynaceae
- Subfamily: Apocynoideae
- Tribe: Apocyneae
- Genus: Aganosma (Blume) G.Don

Synonyms
- Ganosma Decne.; Echites sect. Aganosma Blume, Bijdr. 1040. 1826

= Aganosma =

Genus of flowering plants

Aganosma is a genus of plants in family Apocynaceae first described as a genus in 1837. It is native to China, the Indian subcontinent, and Southeast Asia.

Species

1. Aganosma breviloba Kerr - Guizhou, Myanmar, Thailand
2. Aganosma cymosa (Roxb.) G.Don - Guangxi, Yunnan, Bangladesh, Assam, Sri Lanka, Indochina
3. Aganosma gracilis Hook.f. - Assam, Bhutan, Arunachal Pradesh
4. Aganosma heynei (Spreng.) ined. (syn Echites heynei Spreng.) - India
5. Aganosma lacei Raizada - Myanmar
6. Aganosma petelotii Lý - N Vietnam
7. Aganosma schlechteriana H.Lév. - S China, Assam, N Indochina
8. Aganosma siamensis Craib - Thailand, Vietnam, Guangxi, Guizhou, Yunnan
9. Aganosma wallichii G.Don - Myanmar, Thailand, W Malaysia, Java, Sumatra

formerly included

1. Aganosma acuminata, syn of Amphineurion marginatum
2. Aganosma affinis, syn of Ichnocarpus frutescens
3. Aganosma apoensis, syn of Parsonsia curvisepala
4. Aganosma concanensis, syn of Parsonsia alboflavescens
5. Aganosma euloba, syn of Amphineurion marginatum
6. Aganosma laevigata, syn of Parsonsia alboflavescens
7. Aganosma laevis, syn of Anodendron affine
8. Aganosma macrocarpa, syn of Amphineurion marginatum
9. Aganosma marginata, syn of Amphineurion marginatum
10. Aganosma romburghii, syn of Urceola javanica
11. Aganosma roxburghii, syn of Kamettia caryophyllata
12. Aganosma velutina, syn of Amphineurion marginatum
