= Paper kite butterfly =

Paper kite butterfly may refer to:

- Idea leuconoe, a butterfly species found in Asia and Northern Australia
- Idea malabarica, a butterfly species found in peninsular India
