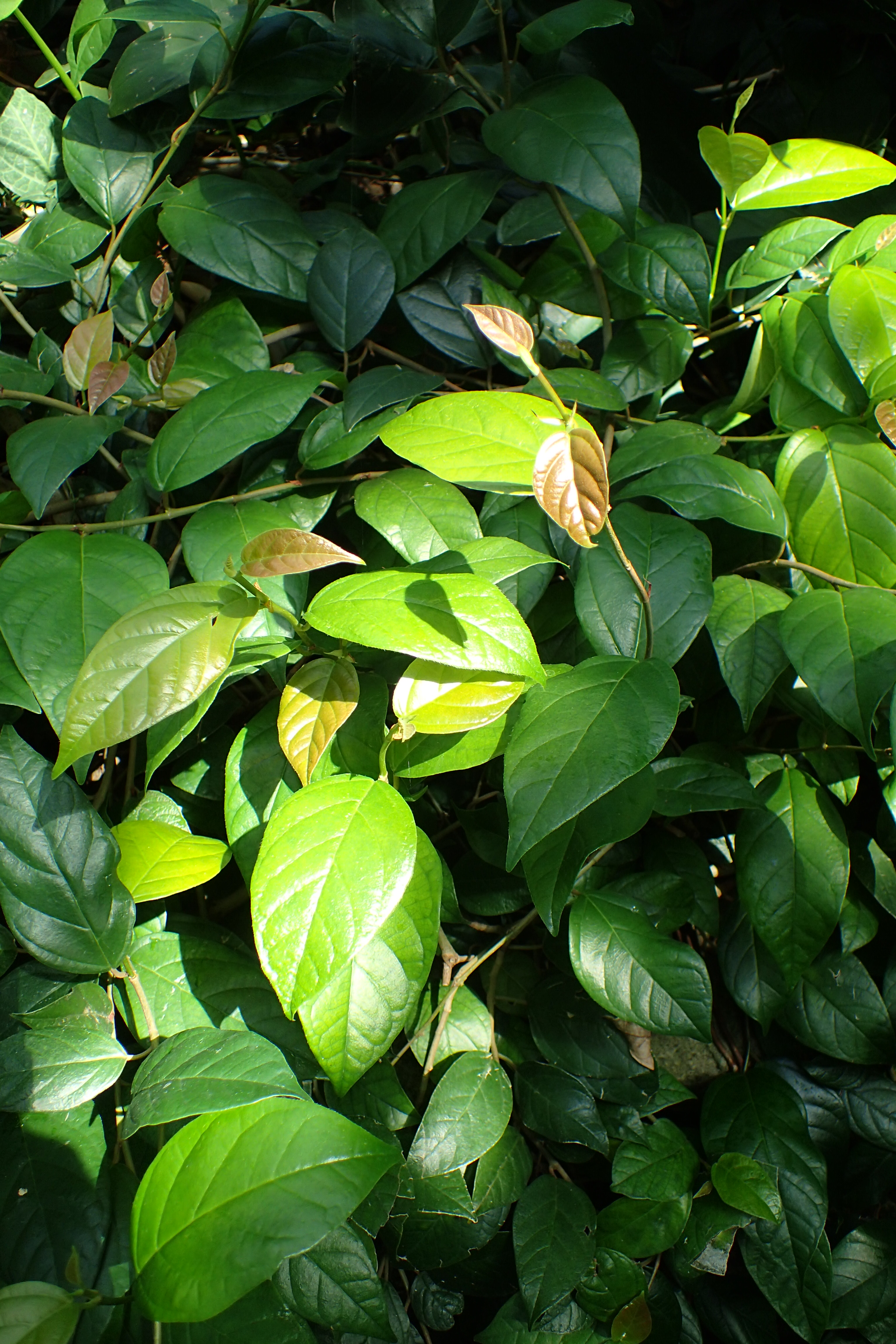
- conservatory specimen

Conservation status
- Least Concern (IUCN 3.1)

Scientific classification
- Kingdom: Plantae
- Clade: Tracheophytes
- Clade: Angiosperms
- Clade: Eudicots
- Clade: Rosids
- Order: Rosales
- Family: Moraceae
- Genus: Ficus
- Subgenus: F. subg. Synoecia
- Species: F. sagittata

Binomial name
- Ficus sagittata Vahl

Synonyms
- List: Ficus adhaerens Miq.; Ficus bordenii Merr.; Ficus carophylla Miq.; Ficus coccinella Zipp. ex Miq.; Ficus compressicaulis Bl.; Ficus crininervia Miq.; Ficus lanaoensis Merr. ex Sata; Ficus lanoensis Merr. ex Sata; Ficus leptocarpa var. adhaerens (Miq.) Miq.; Ficus leptocarpa var. borneensis Miq.; Ficus leptocarpa var. crassa Miq.; Ficus leptocarpa var. oligosperma (Miq.) Miq.; Ficus leptocarpa var. subglabra Miq.; Ficus leptocarpa var. timorensis Miq.; Ficus oligosperma Miq.; Ficus radicans Desf.; Ficus ramentacea Roxb.; Ficus ramosii Merr. ex Sata; Ficus rigescens Miq.; Ficus rubrocarpa Elmer; Ficus sagittata var. adhaerens (Miq.) Corner; Ficus sagittata var. minor Corner; Ficus sagittata var. oligosperma (Miq.) Corner; Ficus subrigida Miq.; Ficus tayabensis Elmer; Pogonotrophe rigida Miq.

= Ficus sagittata =

Species of trailing fig

Ficus sagittata is a trailing fig species, in the family Moraceae, which is native to southern China, eastern India, Bangladesh, Indo-China, Malesia, and the Caroline Islands in the western Pacific. In Vietnam it may be called sung dầu tên or sung bò.

The species was described by Martin Vahl in 1790. No subspecies are listed in the Catalogue of Life.

== Gallery ==
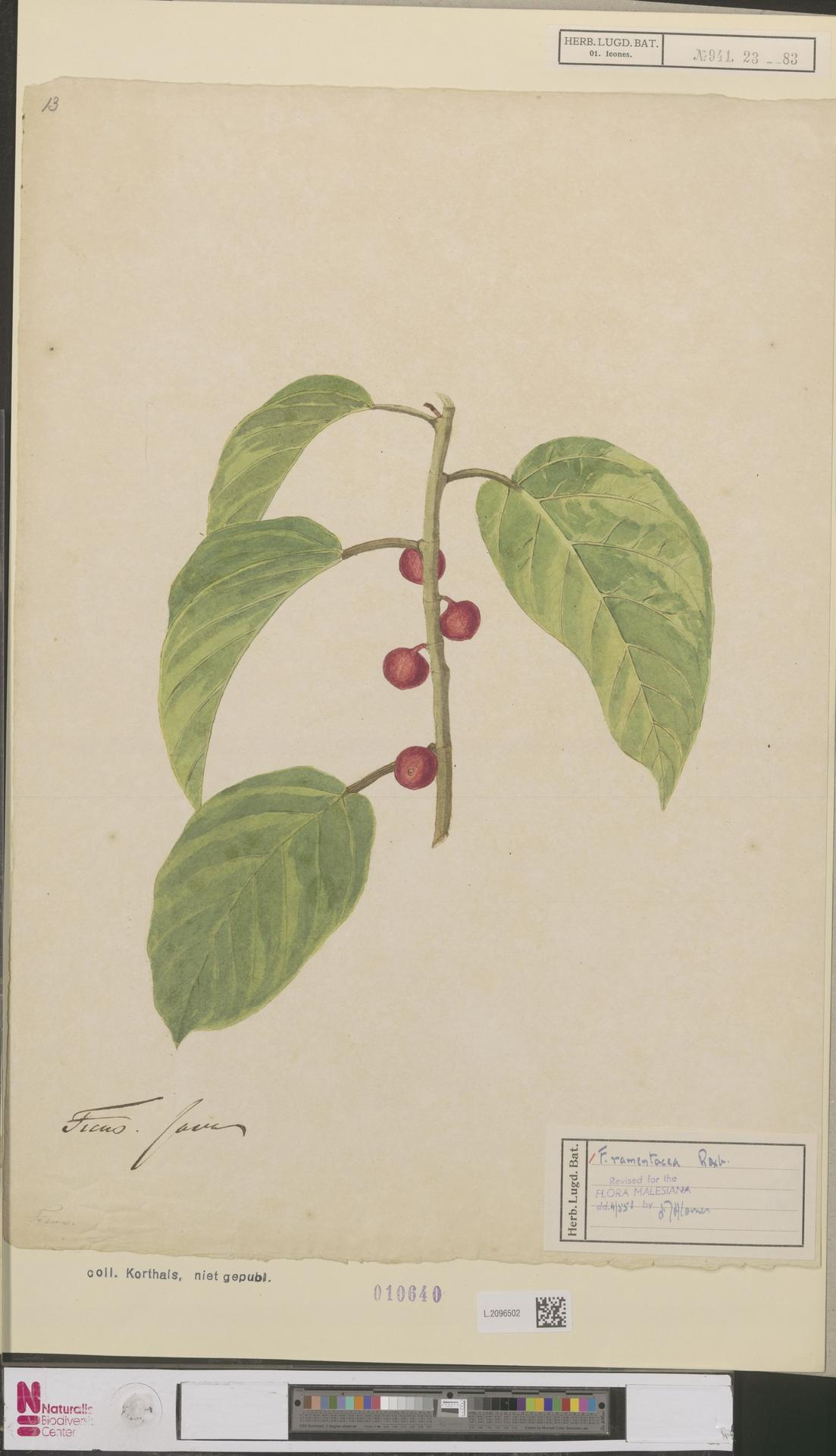

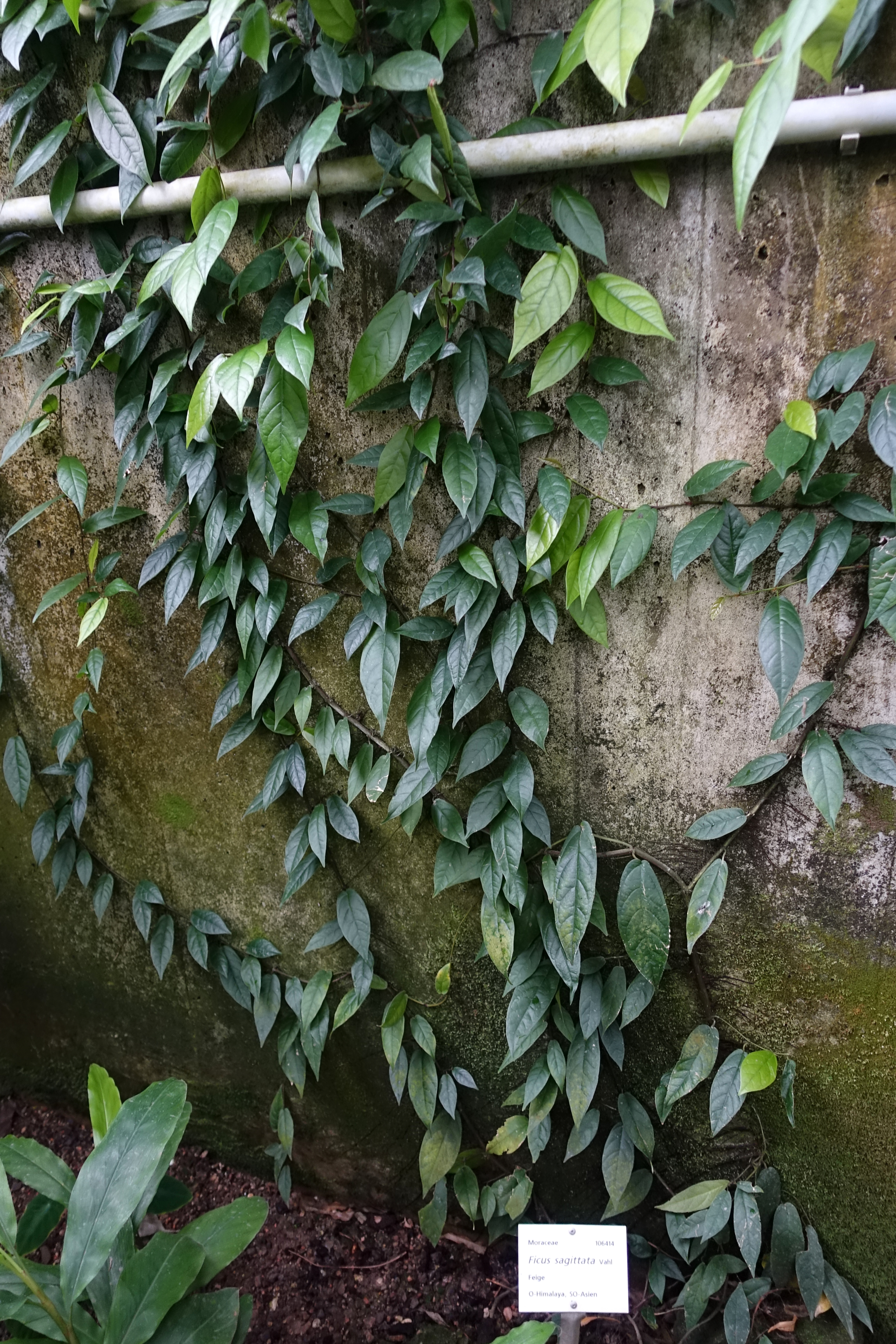
