= Hoya crassicaulis =

Scientific classification
- Kingdom: Plantae
- Clade: Embryophytes
- Clade: Tracheophytes
- Clade: Spermatophytes
- Clade: Angiosperms
- Clade: Eudicots
- Clade: Asterids
- Order: Gentianales
- Family: Apocynaceae
- Genus: Hoya
- Species: H. crassicaulis

Binomial name
- Hoya crassicaulis Elmer ex Kloppenb.

Species of plant

Hoya crassicaulis is a species of flowering plant in the family Apocynaceae. It is native to the Philippines. An epiphyte, it is typically found in the wet tropics. Recommended for smaller gardens, containers, and hanging baskets, there appears to be a cultivar, 'Moon Shadow'.

== Subtaxa ==
The following subspecies are accepted:

- Hoya crassicaulis subsp. capazensis Kloppenb. – Philippines
- Hoya crassicaulis subsp. crassicaulis – southeastern Luzon
