= Parsonsia curvisepala =

Scientific classification
- Kingdom: Plantae
- Clade: Embryophytes
- Clade: Tracheophytes
- Clade: Spermatophytes
- Clade: Angiosperms
- Clade: Eudicots
- Clade: Asterids
- Order: Gentianales
- Family: Apocynaceae
- Genus: Parsonsia
- Species: P. curvisepala

Binomial name
- Parsonsia curvisepala K.Schum.
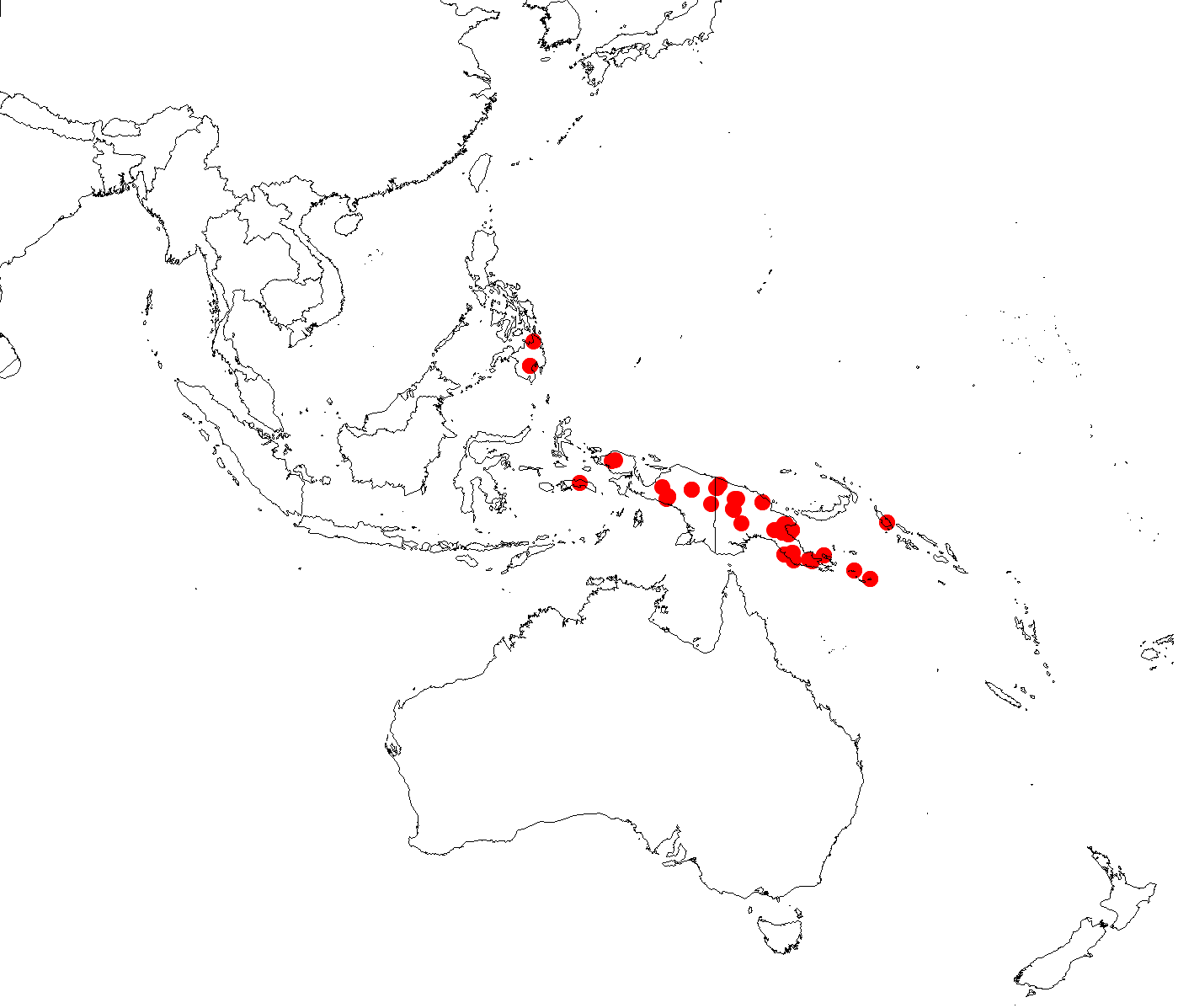
- Occurrence data from GBIF

Synonyms
- Aganosma apoensis Elmer; Lyonsia mollissima Wernham; Parsonsia apoensis (Elmer) Merr. Parsonsia cyathocalyx Markgr. Parsonsia dallmannensis Kaneh. & Hatus. Parsonsia mollissima (Wernham) Markgr. Parsonsia stenocarpa King & Gamble; Parsonsia verticillata K.Schum.

Species of vine

Parsonsia curvisepala is a woody vine of the family Apocynaceae, found in Malaysia, New Guinea, the Philippines, the Solomon Islands, and Sulawesi. This species is second only to Parsonsia alboflavescens in its variability and wide geographic distribution.

== Description ==
The branchlets are covered in short to long brown densely matted woolly hairs. The leaves are 3–4 whorled, but are sometimes opposite. The leaf blade varies from 1.5 to 13.5 x 0.6- 5.8 cm, and is 1.8–4.8 x as long as wide. It has 4–8 pairs of lateral nerves and its tertiary venation is reticulate. The leaf tips usually taper to a point, but sometimes end in a small abrupt point. The leaf base is wedge shaped (with an angle which is sometimes acute and sometimes obtuse). The lower leaf surface is covered in dense brown velvety hairs, while the upper leaf surface is hairy only on the midrib. The elliptic to obovate petiole is 0.5–2.6 cm long.

The inflorescences are in the axils with the flowers clustered at the ends, 2–10.5 cm long. These, too, are covered in densely brown velvety hairs. The peduncles are 0.9–7.5 cm long and the pedicels 2–6.1 mm long. The sepals are linear, strongly reflexed and covered in a dense mat of hairs. The corolla is yellowish and the buds cylindrical, with slightly overlapping triangular lobes. When the tubular corolla is open, the tips of the petals are at right angles to the tube. The corolla may be covered in sparse or dense brown hairs, or alternatively it may be smooth outside and hairy on the inside of the upper tube. The stamens start at from 0.5 to 0.8 mm from corolla base, which is 0.1–0.2 of tube length. The filaments straight, narrow, hairy and 1.1–2 mm long. The anthers are narrowly triangular. The disc consists of 5 separate lobes, which are elliptic, and acute to notched at the tips. Ovary 0.7–1 mm long; style 1.1–2.1 mm long; pistil head 0.6–1 mm long. The fruit is linear and of highly variable dimensions being from 2.2 to 39 cm long and 3.2–5.3 mm wide. It is covered in minute short straight erect hairs. The seed dimensions are 7-17 x 0.4–2 mm.

== Distribution ==
Malaysia (Malay Peninsula), Sulawesi, the Philippines, New Guinea, and the Solomon Islands.

== Habitat ==
This species is found in lowland forests, at elevations of up to 1800 metres.
