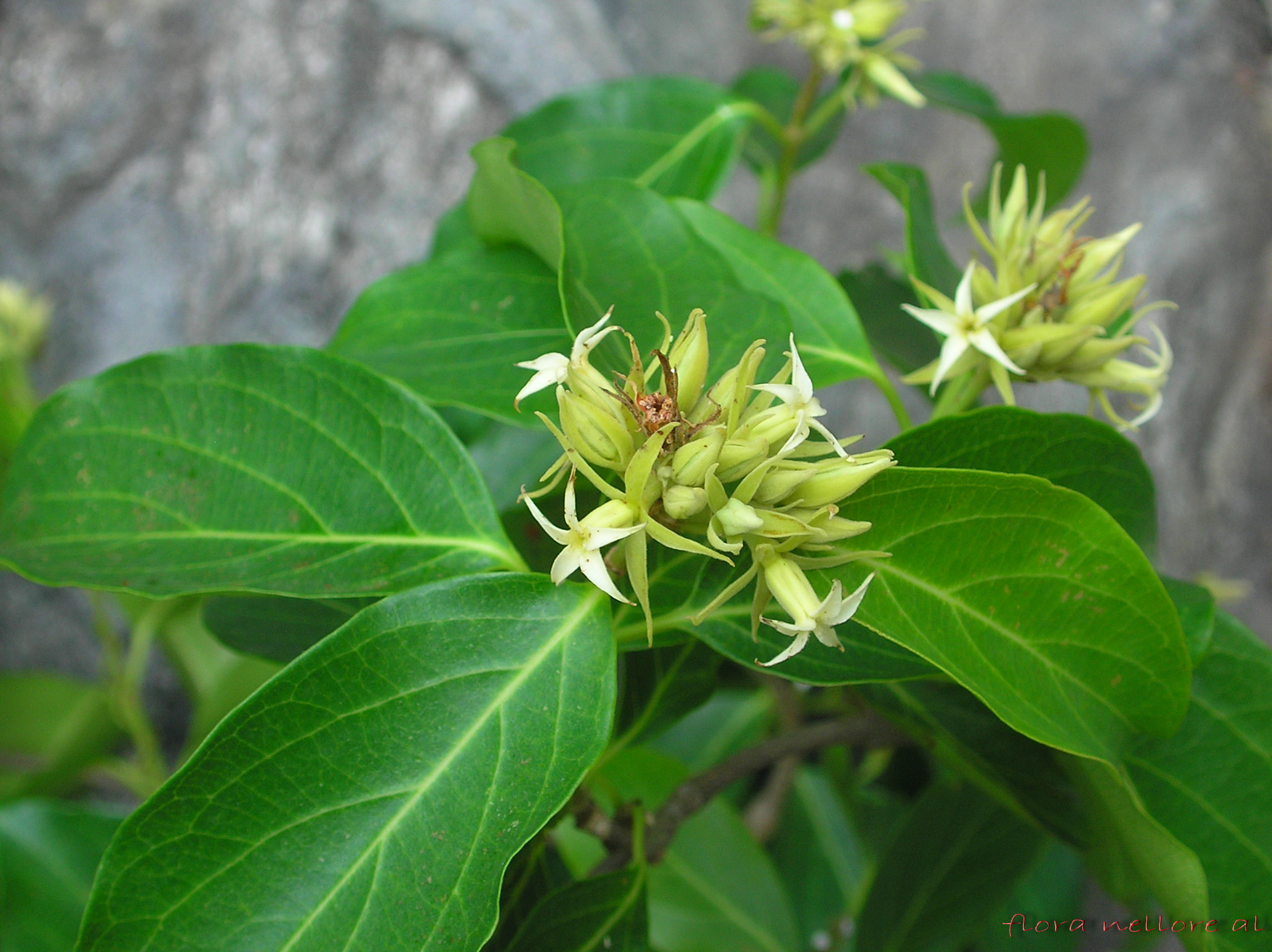
- Flowers and leaves of Aganosma cymosa

Scientific classification
- Kingdom: Plantae
- Clade: Tracheophytes
- Clade: Angiosperms
- Clade: Eudicots
- Clade: Asterids
- Order: Gentianales
- Family: Apocynaceae
- Genus: Aganosma
- Species: A. cymosa

Binomial name
- Aganosma cymosa (Roxb.) G.Don

Synonyms
- Echites cymosus Roxb. 1832; Echites confertus Wall., name published without description; Aganosma cymosa var. glabra A.DC.; Aganosma doniana Wight; Aganosma conferta G.Don; Aganosma cymosa var. lanceolata Hook.f.; Aganosma harmandiana Pierre ex Spire; Aganosma cymosa var. fulva Craib; Aganosma elegans G.Don; Echites elegans Wall., name published without description

= Aganosma cymosa =

Species of flowering plant

Aganosma cymosa is a liana that can grow up to 10 m (33 ft) in length, pale brownish tomentose. Leaf-stalks are 1–2 cm (0.4–0.8 in), leaf blade broadly ovate or orbicular, 5–16 cm (2.0–6.3 in) by 4–12 cm (1.6–4.7 in), base rounded or obtuse, apex acuminate or obtuse, rarely retuse, lateral veins eight to ten pairs. Flowers are borne in many-flowered clusters at branch ends, which are carried on stalks up to 6 cm (2.4 in). Bracts and bracteoles are very narrowly elliptic, about 1 cm (0.4 in) long. Flower-stalks are about 5 mm (0.2 in). Calyx with several glands inside margin of sepals; sepals very narrowly elliptic, about 1 cm (0.4 in), pubescent on both surfaces. Flowers are white, minutely tomentose outside, glabrous at throat; tube shorter than sepals, 6–7 mm (0.2–0.3 in); lobes oblong, as long as tube. Disc longer than ovary. Ovary pubescent at apex. Follicles 2, cylindric, to 30 cm (12 in) by 0.8–1.2 cm (0.3–0.5 in), yellow hirsute. Seeds oblong, 1–2 cm (0.4–0.8 in) by about 5 mm (0.2 in), coma 2–4.5 cm (0.8–1.8 in). It is native to China (Guangxi, Yunnan), Bangladesh, India, Sri Lanka, and Indochina (Cambodia, Laos, Thailand, Vietnam).

== Ecology ==
Aganosma cymosa is the larval host plant for Malabar tree nymph (Idea malabarica).

== Vernacular names ==
Vernacular names include:

- Kannada: chidaralanabilu, chithra leena balli, citrelinaballi
- Malayalam: anaikaita, anakkayyerram, tsjeria-pu-pal-valli
- Tamil: manimalaankodi, sellakkodi

== Taxonomy ==
Varieties

1. Aganosma cymosa var. conferta Hook.f. - S India
2. Aganosma cymosa var. cymosa - Yunnan, Guangxi, Assam, Bangladesh, Indochina
3. Aganosma cymosa var. elegans (G.Don) Hook.f. - S India, Sri Lanka
