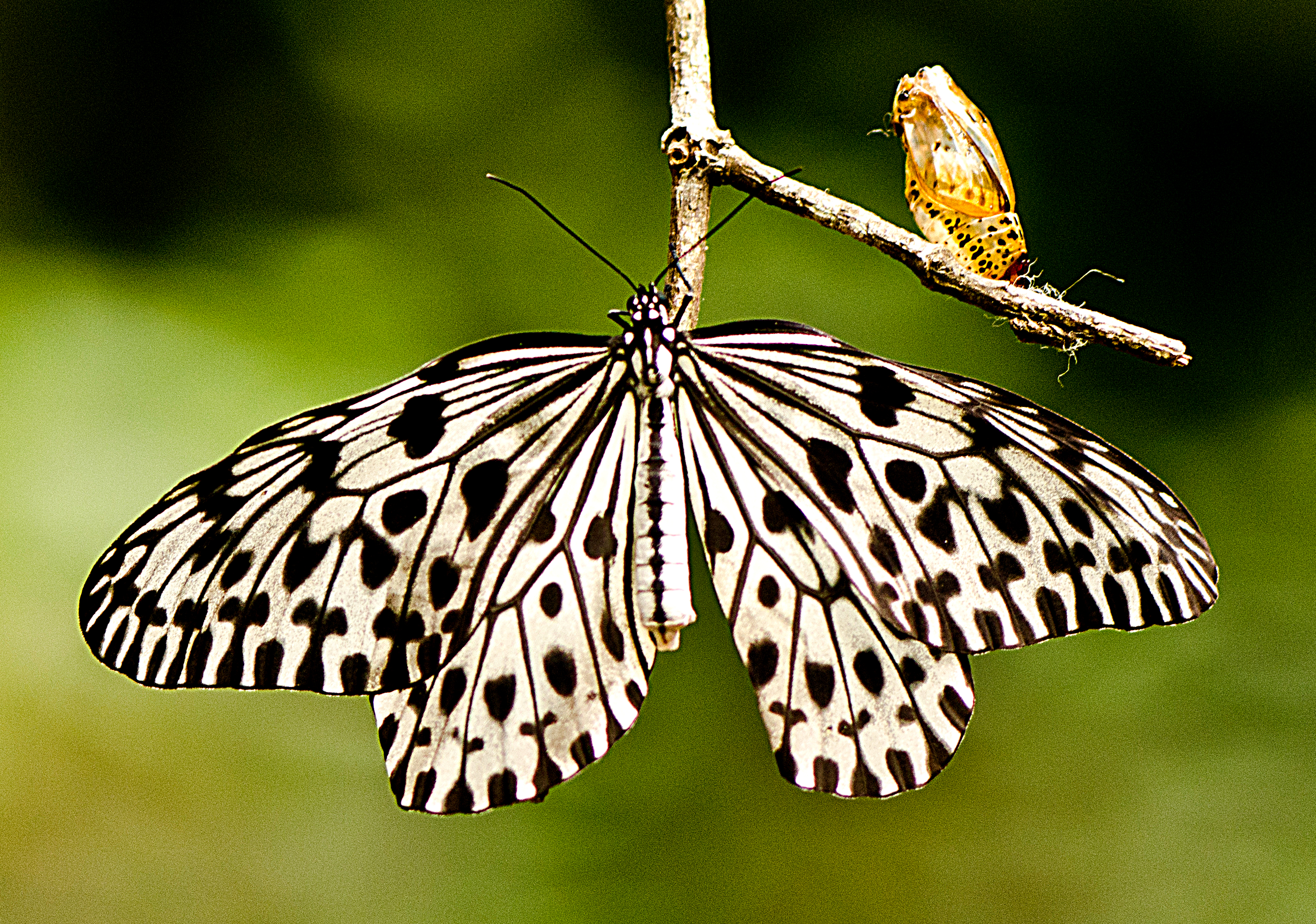

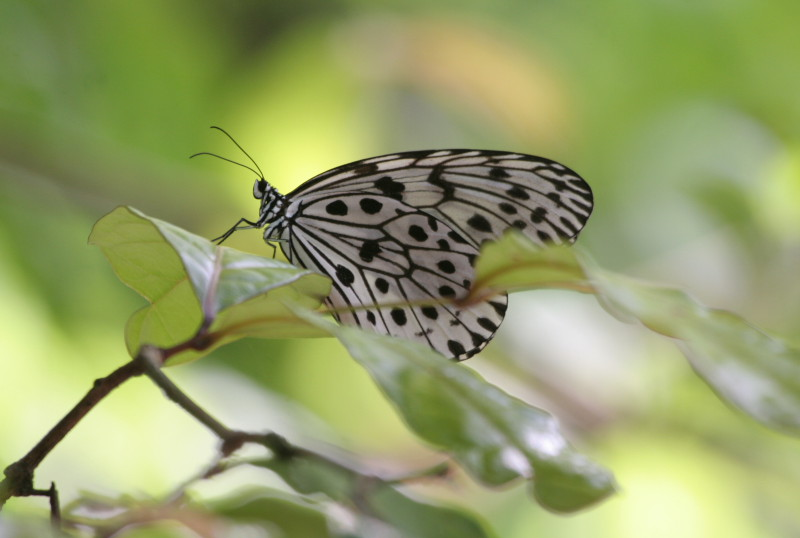

Conservation status
- Near Threatened (IUCN 2.3)

Scientific classification
- Kingdom: Animalia
- Phylum: Arthropoda
- Clade: Pancrustacea
- Class: Insecta
- Order: Lepidoptera
- Family: Nymphalidae
- Genus: Idea
- Species: I. malabarica

Binomial name
- Idea malabarica Moore, 1877

= Idea malabarica =

Malabar tree-nymph

Species of butterfly

Idea malabarica, the Malabar tree nymph, is a large butterfly found in peninsular India. that belongs to the danaid group of the family Nymphalidae. It is found in forest clearings and above the forest canopy.

== Description ==
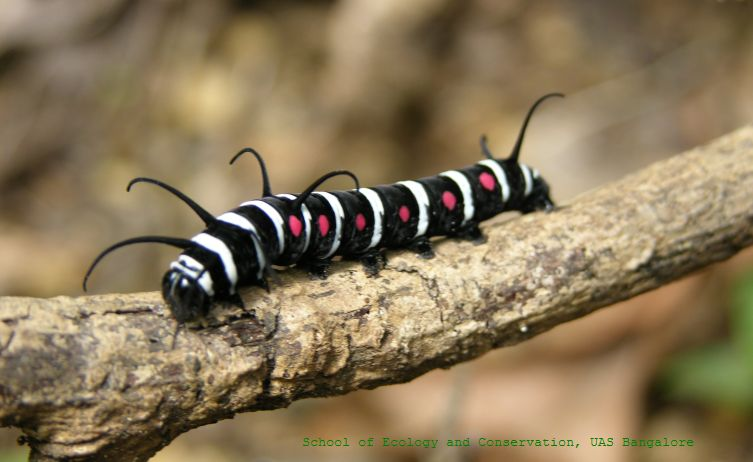
Caterpillar

The Malabar tree nymph has a wingspan of 120–154 mm. It appears as a mostly white butterfly with black markings. Upperside semitransparent white, sometimes slightly infuscate with a powdering of black scales. Forewing with the following black marks: narrow margins on both sides of the veins, a dusky streak along dorsum, large sub-basal spots in interspaces 1 and 2 (produced inwardly in former), a large oval spot crossing three streaks in discoidal cell, a spot above it in interspace 11, a broad margin to the discocellulars and three rows of spots on outer half of wing, the discal series outwardly conical and curved sharply inwards opposite apex, the subterminal series in pairs coalescent on the veins, the terminal series elongate on veins and in interspaces; costa with a black streak at base, beyond black and white alternately. Hindwing with similar markings; cell with two streaks, the upper forked towards apex; costa white, two spots not touching the vein below in interspace 8; paired spots on veins 5, 8, and 7 not coalescent but one behind the other, black. Underside similar. Antennae black; head and thorax streaked and spotted with black; abdomen white, with broad dusky black streak above.

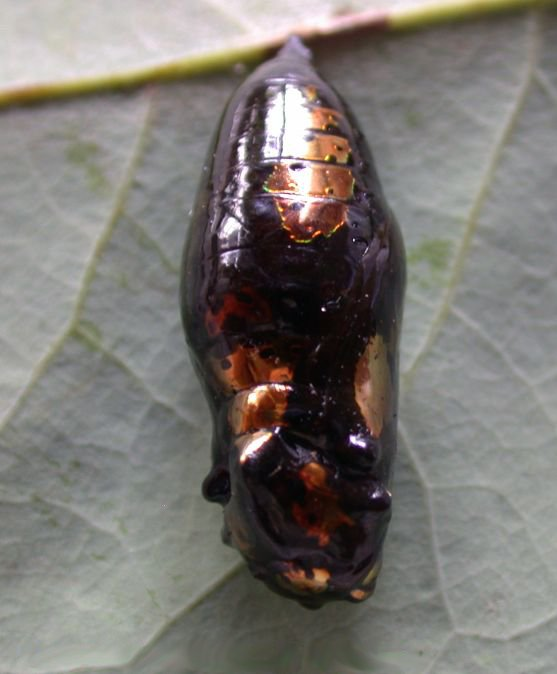
Chrysalis

A variety kanarensis, Moore, has been noted to be identical in markings but always smaller. It was recorded from the Konkan and North Kanara.

In December 2021, The Malabar Tree Nymph was declared the state butterfly of Goa, India.

This species is listed as "Near Threatened" on the IUCN Red List, threatened by habitat loss due to deforestation, pesticides, and herbicides.

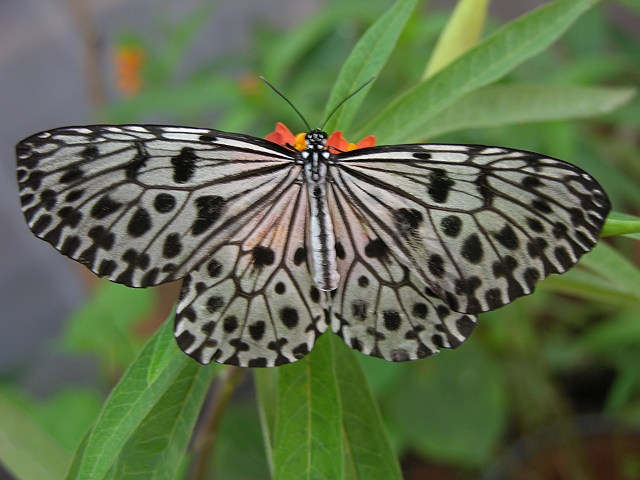
Adult, dorsal view, from India

== Range ==
Within India, the species is found in South India especially in the Western Ghats. The species is endemic to the Western Ghats and though it is found in southern Maharashtra, its real distribution starts from Goa.

== Habits ==
Their flight is slow, weak and fluttery. They glide a lot, giving members of this genus the other name of paperkite. They often glide above the tree canopy but every now and then move lower down in forest openings. They are unpalatable like other members of the Danainae.

== Food plant ==
The larvae are known to feed on plants of the species Aganosma cymosa (Apocynaceae). Another species of Apocynaceae, Parsonsia spiralis (now recognised as a synonym of Parsonsia alboflavescens) has also been noted as a larval host plant and it is believed that many more species in the family may be discovered.

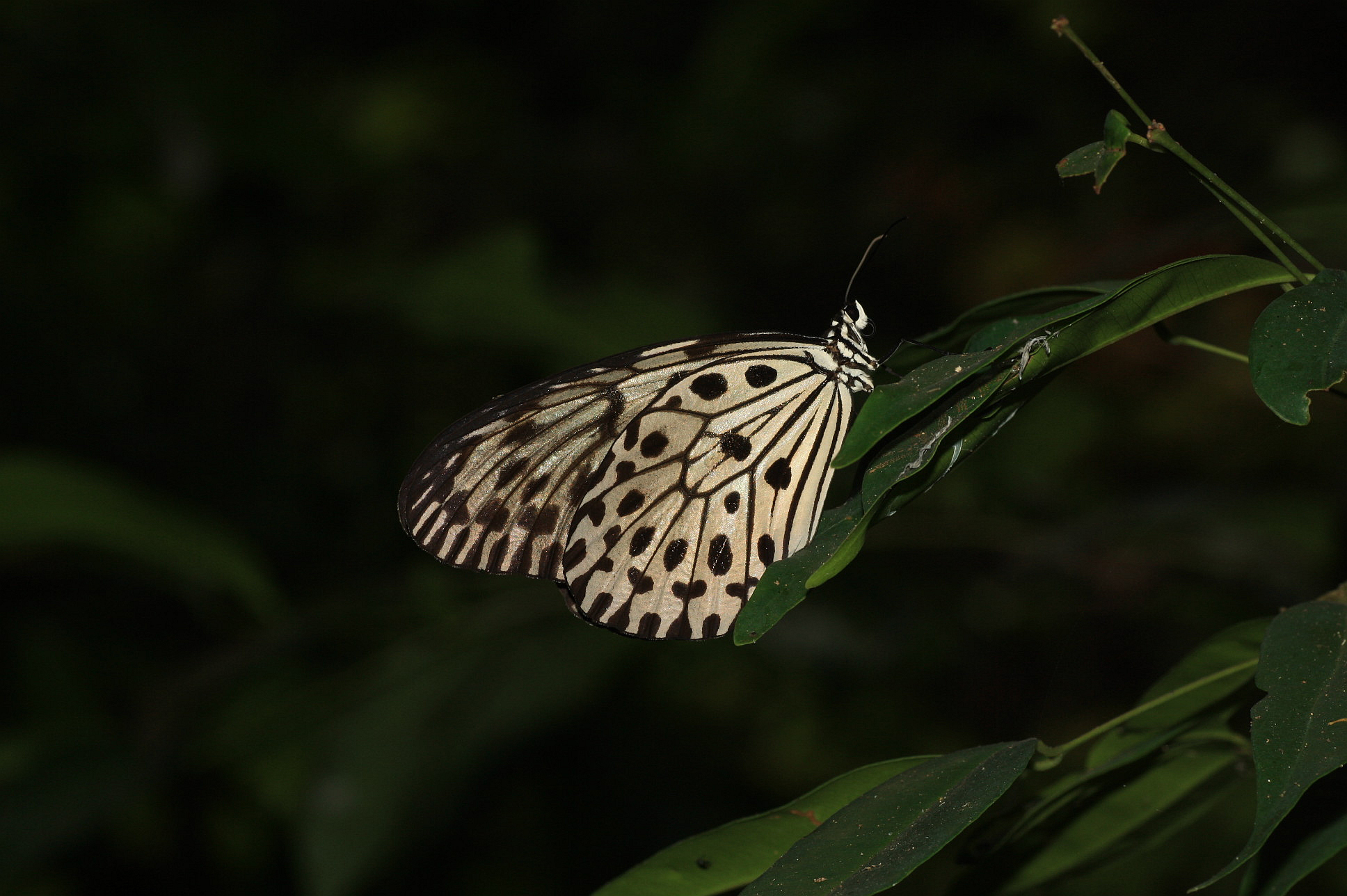
Malabar tree nymph, Udupi, India

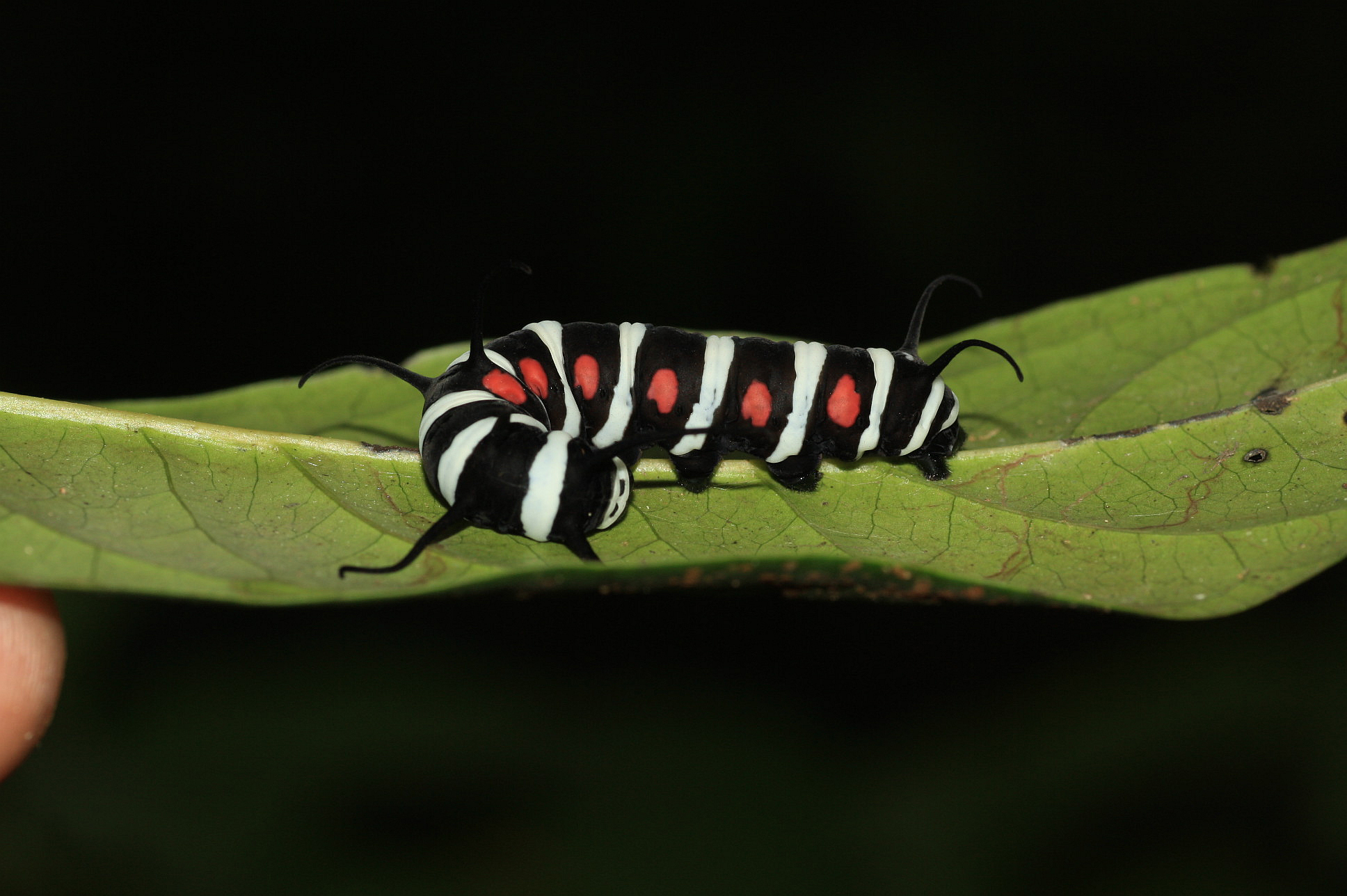
Malabar tree nymph larvae, Udupi

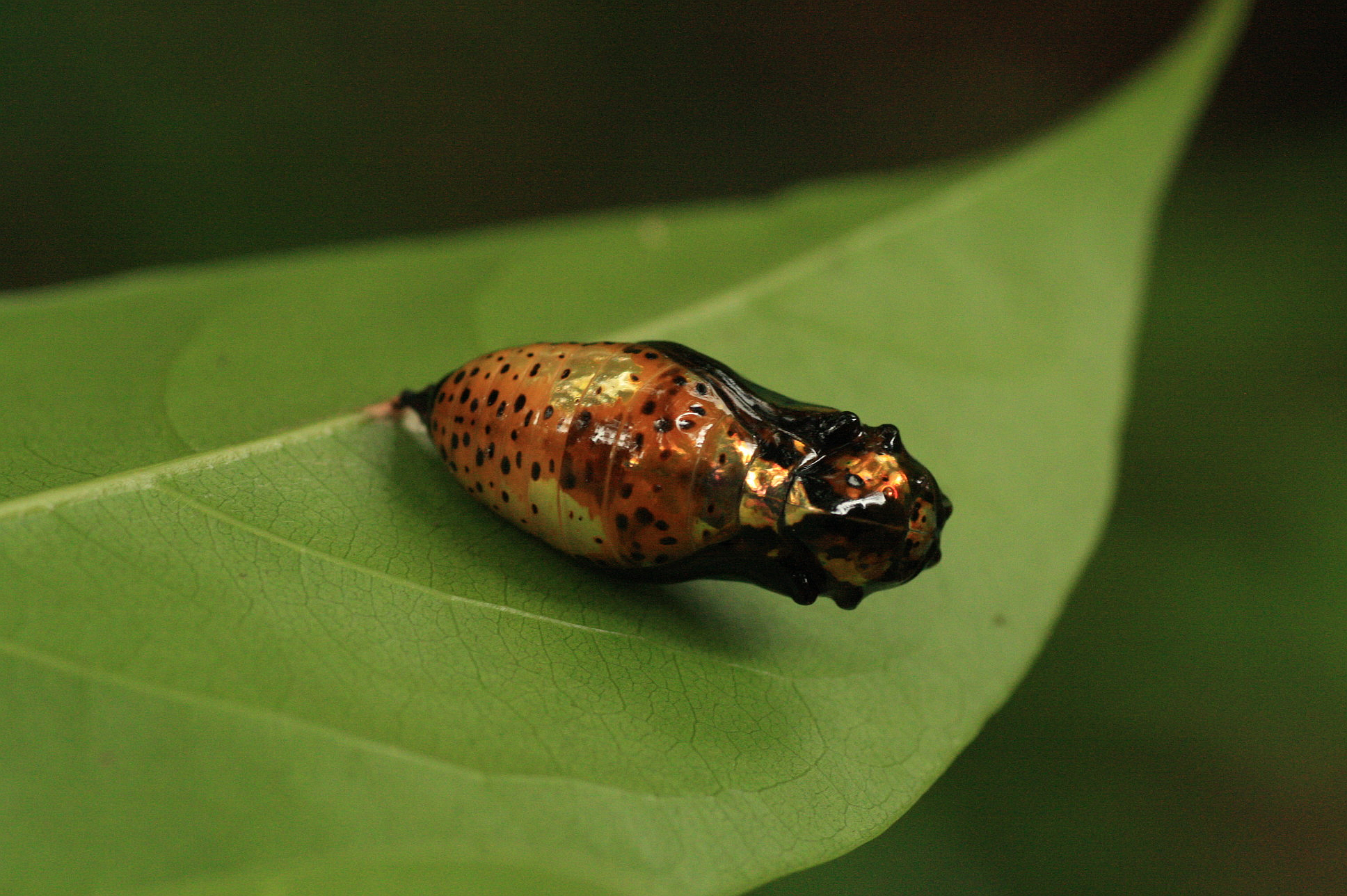
Malabar tree nymph pupa, Udupi

== Other sources ==
- Evans, W.H. (1932). The Identification of Indian Butterflies (2nd ed.). Mumbai, India: Bombay Natural History Society.
- Wynter-Blyth, Mark Alexander (1957). Butterflies of the Indian Region. Bombay, India: Bombay Natural History Society. ISBN 978-81-7019-232-9.

== See also ==
- Danainae
- Nymphalidae
- List of butterflies of India
- List of butterflies of India (Nymphalidae)
