= Thomas Ryder (engraver) =

English engraver (1746–1810)

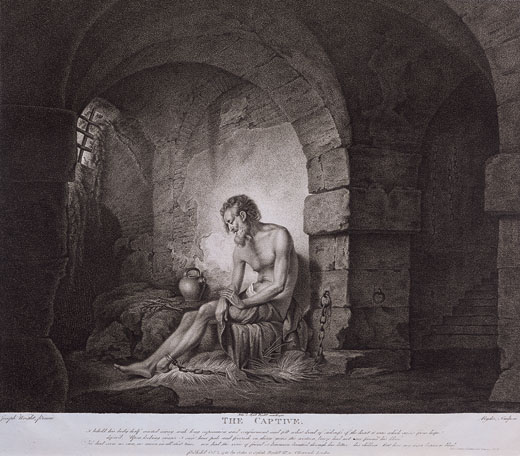
"The Captive", an engraving by Ryder, after Joseph Wright

Thomas Ryder (1746–1810), engraver, was a pupil of James Basire, and during his apprenticeship established drawings with the Society of Artists in 1766 and 1767. He was also one of the first students in the schools of the Royal Academy.

== Works ==
Ryder engraved a few plates in the line manner, of which the most important are "The Politician" (a portrait of Benjamin Franklin), after S. Elmer, 1782; and "Vortigern and Rowena", after A. Kauffman, 1802; but he is best known by his works in stipple, which are among the finest of their class. These include "The Last Supper", after Benjamin West; "The Murder of James I of Scotland", after Opie; "Prudence and Beauty", after A. Kauffman; nine of the plates to the large edition of Boydell's "Shakspeare"; and others from designs by Bigg, Bunbury, Cipriani, Cosway, Ryley, and Shelley. Ryder also engraved portraits of Mrs. Damer, after Kauffman; Henry Bunbury, after Lawrence; Sir William Watson, M.D., after Abbot; and Maria Linley, after Westall. His plates are usually printed in brown ink and occasionally in colours. He had a son of the same Christian name who was also an engraver, and together they executed the whole-length portrait of Queen Charlotte, after Beechey, prefixed to the second volume of Boydell's ‘Shakspeare.’
