= Stephen Elmer =

English painter

Stephen Elmer ARA (baptised 1715 – 1796) was an English painter.

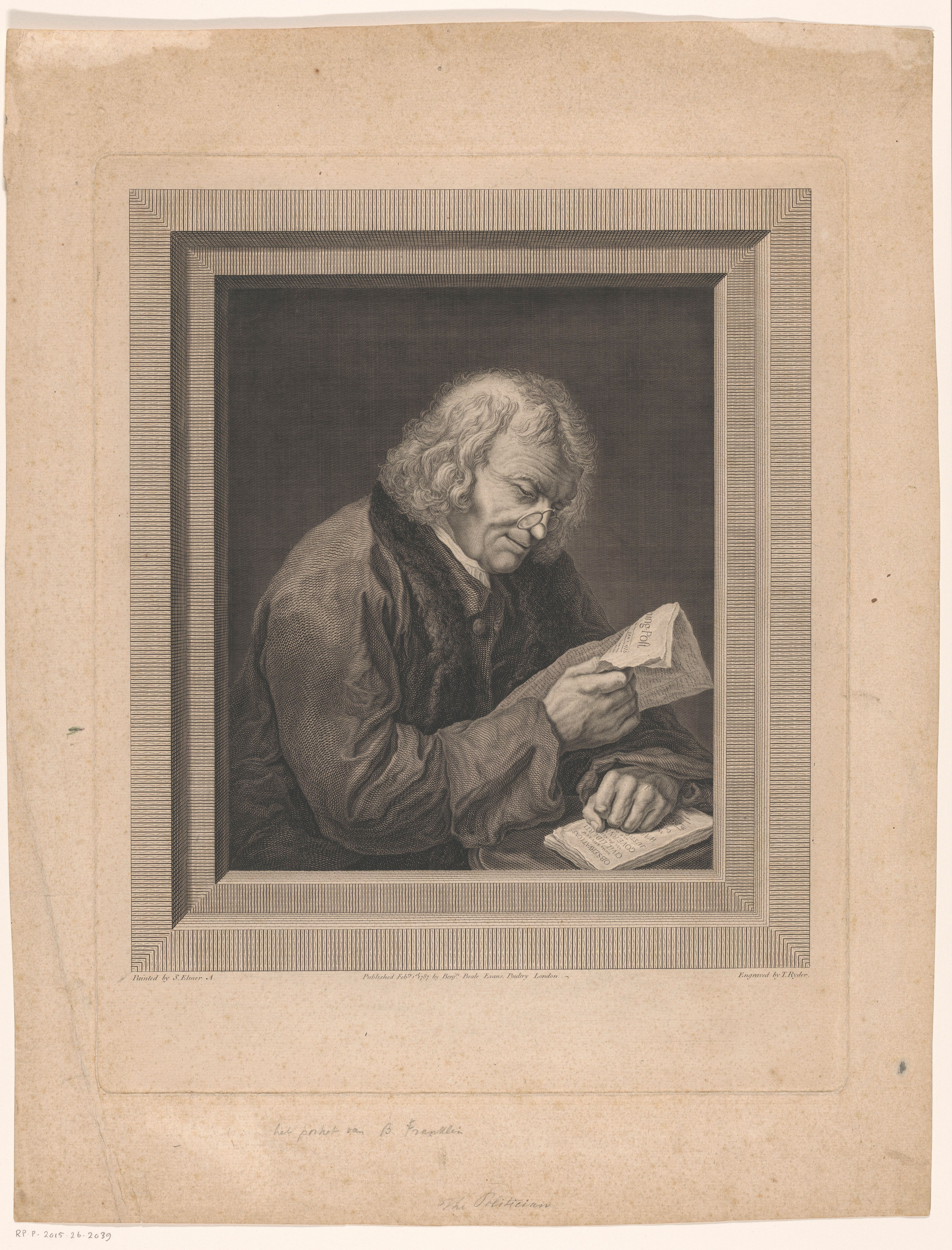
Portrait of Benjamin Franklin, by Thomas Ryder after Elmer

Elmer resided at Farnham, Surrey, where he was a maltster. He turned his hand to painting, and developed a special skill for depicting still life and dead game. He was a member of the Society of Artists in 1763, and exhibited numerous pictures up to 1772, when he first began to exhibit at the Royal Academy. He was elected an Associate of the Academy later that year. From that time to 1795, the year before his death, he contributed a great number of pictures, which were very popular, and were painted in a bold, free manner, and with great truth to nature. He did not confine himself entirely to still life, occasionally painting genre pictures, such as "The Miser" (engraved by B. Granger), "The Politician" (engraved by T. Ryder), scripture pieces, such as "The Last Supper", formerly over the altar, but now in the vestry of Farnham Church, and portraits. Some of his still-life pictures were engraved by J. Scott, J. F. Miller, C. Turner, and others.

Elmer died and was buried at Farnham in 1790. He does not appear to have been married, but left his property, including a large collection of his own paintings, to his nephew. The latter were collected, and exhibited at the great room in the Haymarket in the spring of 1799, under the title of "Elmer's Sportsman's Exhibition". Some of these were disposed of for good prices, and the remainder were removed to Gerrard Street, Soho, where they were accidentally destroyed by fire on 6 February 1801.

His nephew, William Elmer, was a painter of the same class of subject. He practised in Ireland, and occasionally exhibited at the Royal Academy between 1783 and 1799. There is a small mezzotint portrait of him as a schoolboy, dated 26 June 1772, and engraved by Butler Clowes.
