= Emma Osterman Elmer =

American librarian and author

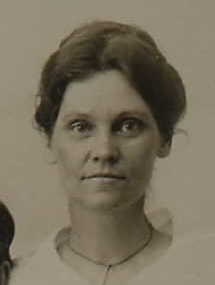
- Born: August 25, 1872; Arlington
- Died: September 5, 1956 (aged 84)
- Occupation: Librarian, writer
- Employer: National Library of the Philippines

Emma Osterman Elmer (1867 – September 5, 1956) was an American librarian and author known for her cataloging work in the Philippines. She and her husband, botanist Adolph Daniel Edward Elmer were held prisoner in Santo Tomas Internment Camp during World War II. He died there and she returned to the United States.

Emma Osterman was born in Arlington, Nebraska. She was the author of several books about the plant life in the Philippines including Our Philippine Trees and Our Philippine Forests. She was also the creator of Checklist of publications of the government of the Philippine Islands, which she wrote while serving as Chief of the Public Documents section of the Philippine Library. This publication, which attempted to detail every publication created by the post-Philippine–American War government, was called "the most important publication issued by the Philippine Library since its inception."

Elmer married Adolph Daniel Edward Elmer in 1902. They had one son, Anton Dambor Elmer, in 1906.
