= Greg Elmer =

American academic

Greg Elmer (born 1967 in Birmingham, U.K.) is Bell Media Research Chair, Professor of Communication & Culture, and Director of the Infoscape Research Lab at Toronto Metropolitan University (formerly Ryerson University) in Toronto, Canada. Elmer is an internet researcher and documentary film maker whose work focuses on theories of surveillance, social protest, political communication, and media financialization.

He is author of Profiling Machines: Mapping the Personal Information Economy (MIT Press: 2004) and, with Andy Opel, Preempting Dissent (ARP Press: 2008); Infrastructure Critical, with Alessandra Renzi (ARP Press: 2012); The Permanent Campaign: New Media, New Politics, with Ganaele Langlois and Fenwick McKelvey (Peter Lang 2012); two edited books; and a number of articles and book chapters. Elmer previously held faculty appointments in the Department of Communication at the University of Pittsburgh (1999–2000), Boston College (2000–2003), and Florida State University (2003–2004). Elmer is also adjunct Professor at York University (Toronto). He previously served as a research director at the Webometrics Research Institute, Yeungnam University, South Korea.

== Early life ==
Elmer was awarded a PhD in Communication from the University of Massachusetts Amherst in 2000.

== Career ==
In the fall of 2006 Elmer, along with a number of graduate students at the Infoscape Research Lab at Ryerson University in Toronto, initiated the Code Politics Project, the first comprehensive study of the internet in Canadian politics. The lab's key researchers/graduate students include Zach Devereaux, Ganaele Langlois, Fenwick McKelvey, Peter Ryan, and Brady Curlew. Research reports from the project have become weekly readings for journalists, members of Parliament, political staff, and other communications and government relations employees in Ontario and across Canada. Research from the project has also been highlighted on CBC, CPAC, Global, CTV Newsnet, CBC Radio Canada, the Globe and Mail, and the Toronto Star.

In the spring of 2007 Elmer was visiting faculty fellow at the Virtual Knowledge Studio, Royal Dutch Academy of Social Sciences, Amsterdam. He has also received fellowships from the Social Science Research Council (SSRC, New York City) and the Quebec government's FCAR agency. In the summer 2006 he was awarded a three-year research grant from the Social Sciences and Humanities Research Council of Canada. In 2009 Elmer was awarded two three-year research grants from the Social Sciences and Humanities Research Council of Canada (SSHRC). And in 2012 his research team was awarded a 5-year SSHRC grant to study theories of methods for social media.

In October 2007 Elmer joined the Canadian political newspaper The Hill Times as a regular columnist. During the 2008 federal election Elmer served as a consultant and commentator for the Canadian Broadcasting Corporation's coverage of the internet campaign. The resulting project—Ormiston Online—was awarded a Canadian Academy of Television and Cinema Gemini Award for best Cross Platform Project (2009).

In 2009-2010 Elmer was awarded visiting research fellowships at the University of Manchester, Anglia Ruskin University, and the London School of Economics. In 2013-2014 he served as faculty fellow in the department of media and communications, Goldsmiths College, University of London.
