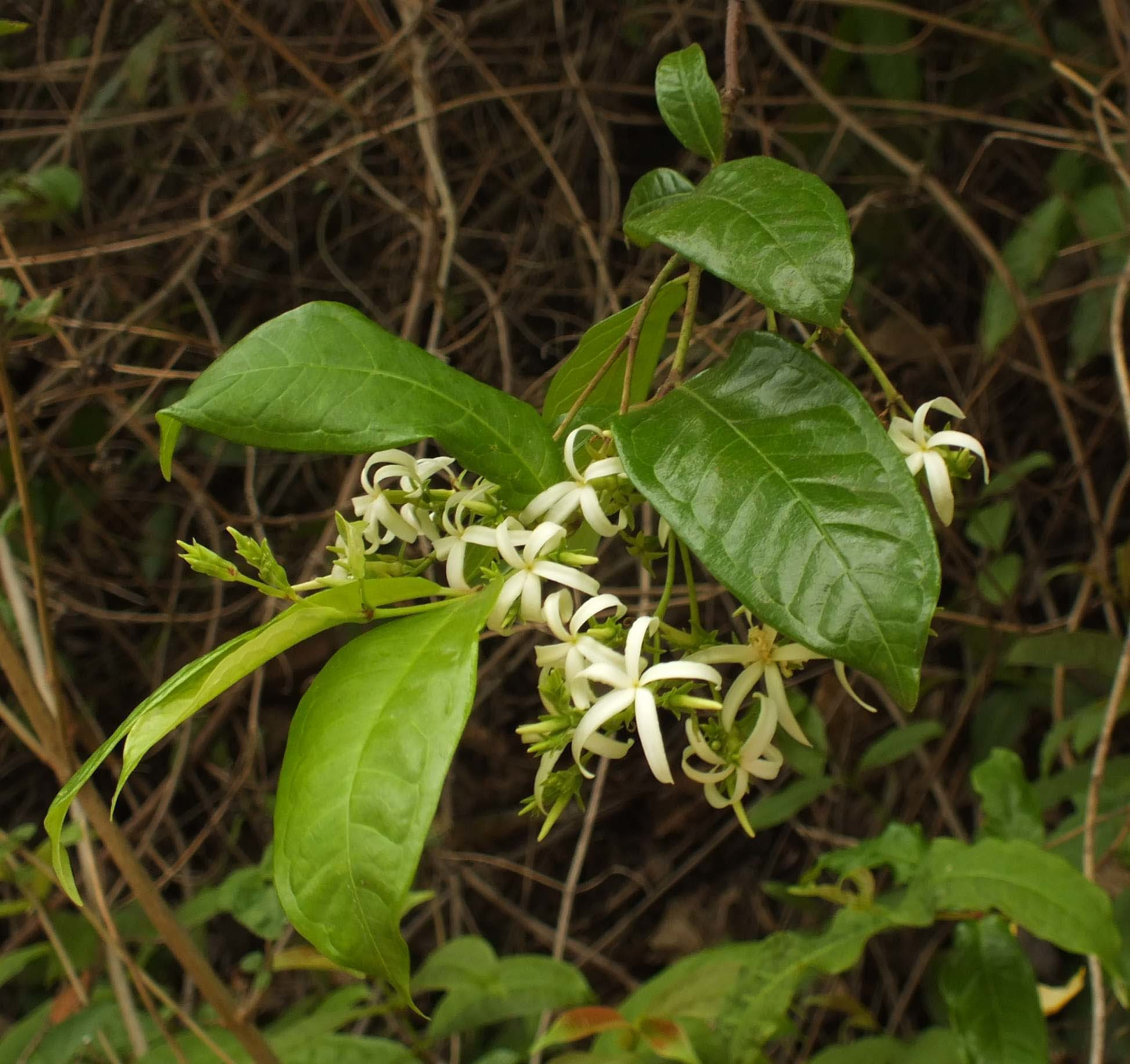

Scientific classification
- Kingdom: Plantae
- Clade: Tracheophytes
- Clade: Angiosperms
- Clade: Eudicots
- Clade: Asterids
- Order: Gentianales
- Family: Apocynaceae
- Subfamily: Apocynoideae
- Tribe: Apocyneae
- Genus: Amphineurion (A.DC.) Pichon
- Species: A. marginatum

Binomial name
- Amphineurion marginatum (Roxb.) D.J.Middleton

Synonyms
- Aganosma marginata (Roxb.) G.Don; Aganosma acuminata (Roxb.) G.Don; Amphineurion acuminatum (Roxb.) Pichon; Echites acuminatus Roxb. 1832, illegitimate homonym, not Ruiz & Pav. 1799 nor Willdenow ex A. DC. 1844; Echites marginatus Roxb.; Echites cristatus Roth; Chonemorpha cristata (Roth) G.Don; Echites repens Blanco 1837, illegitimate homonym, not Jacq. 1760; Aganosma macrocarpa A.DC.; Aganosma velutina A.DC.; Echites apoxys Voigt; Echites procumbens Blanco; Aganosma euloba Miq.; Ichnocarpus acuminatus (G.Don) Fern.-Vill.; Ichnocarpus macrocarpus (A.DC.) Fern.-Vill.; Ichnocarpus velutinus (A.DC.) Fern.-Vill.; Holarrhena procumbens (Blanco) Merr.; Amphineurion acuminatum (G.Don) Pichon; Amphineurion velutinum (A.DC.) Pichon

= Amphineurion =

Genus of flowering plants

Amphineurion is a genus of plants in the family Apocynaceae, first described as a genus in 1948. It contains only one known species, Amphineurion marginatum, native to Cambodia, S China (Guangdong, Hainan), India, Indonesia, Laos, Malaysia, Philippines, Thailand and Vietnam.

== Description & habitat ==
Aganosma marginata is a liana that can grow up to 8 metres (26 ft) in length. When young, it sometimes forms a shrub with arching branches. Its habitats are mountain forests and seashore thickets.

== Uses ==
In times of famine, including during the Khmer Rouge regime years, the people of Cambodia eat the young leaves and stem of this climber, called krâllam' paè or trâllam' paè in Khmer language. Various parts of the plant are also used in traditional medicine to treat a number of ailments, including menstruation problems.
