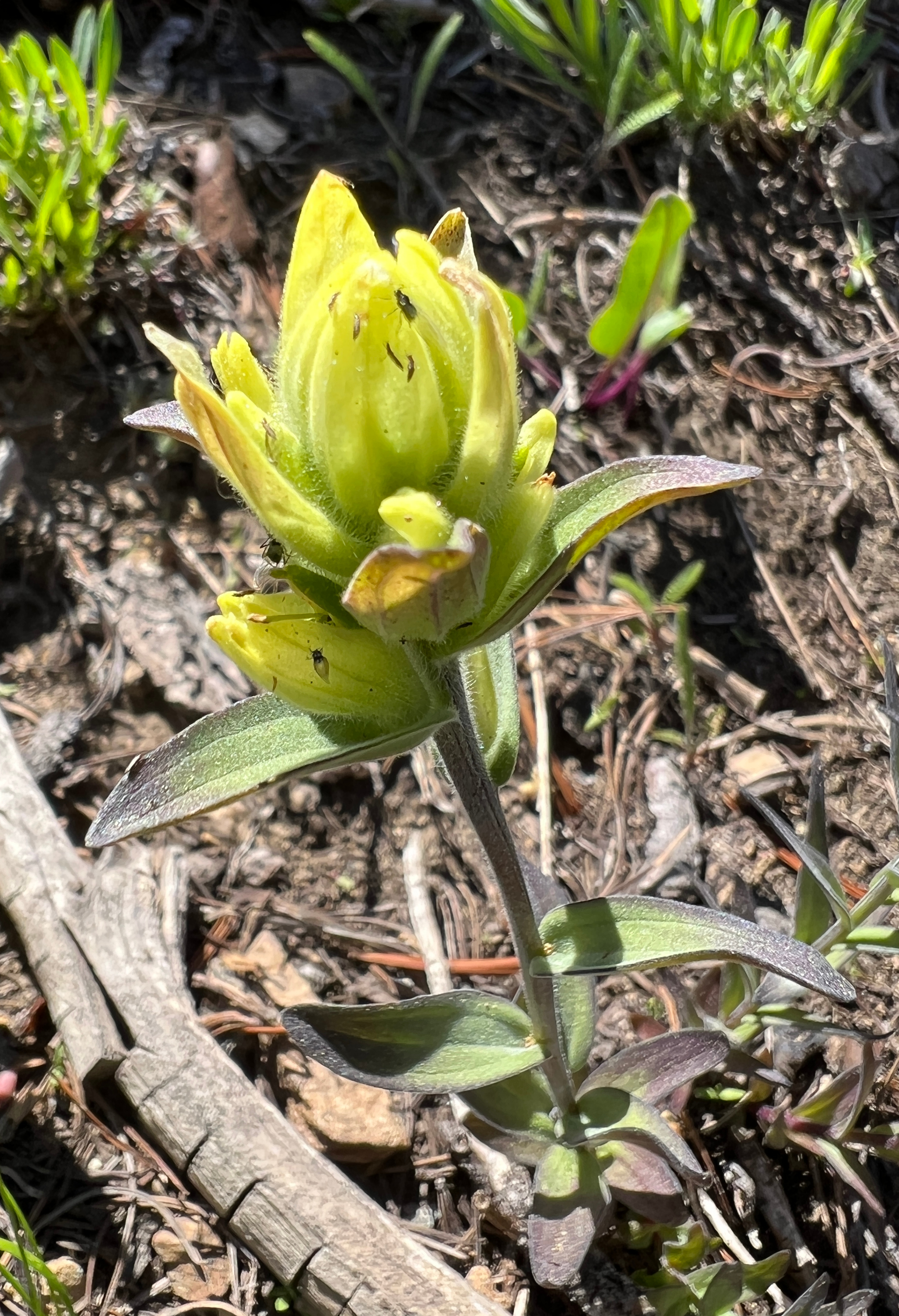

Conservation status
- Apparently Secure (NatureServe)

Scientific classification
- Kingdom: Plantae
- Clade: Tracheophytes
- Clade: Angiosperms
- Clade: Eudicots
- Clade: Asterids
- Order: Lamiales
- Family: Orobanchaceae
- Genus: Castilleja
- Species: C. elmeri

Binomial name
- Castilleja elmeri Fernald

= Castilleja elmeri =

Species of flowering plant

Castilleja elmeri is a species of flowering plant in the family Orobanchaceae with the common name Elmer's paintbrush. As with most Castilleja species, this is a facultative root hemiparasite and will usually be seen growing close to a host plant.

== Description ==
Unbranched stems grow from a small woody base and are up to 30 cm tall. Leaves are lanceolate and usually entire, and the flowers form a relatively (for a Castilleja) compact head that is usually red or pale yellow, sometimes nearly white or intermediate colors. Leaves, stems, and bracts are covered with fine short hairs.

== Range and habitat ==
Castilleja elmeri grows in mountains from southern British Columbia to the Wenatchee Mountains and Mount Rainier in Washington State. In the Wenatchee Mountains it is notable for being common on serpentine soils.
