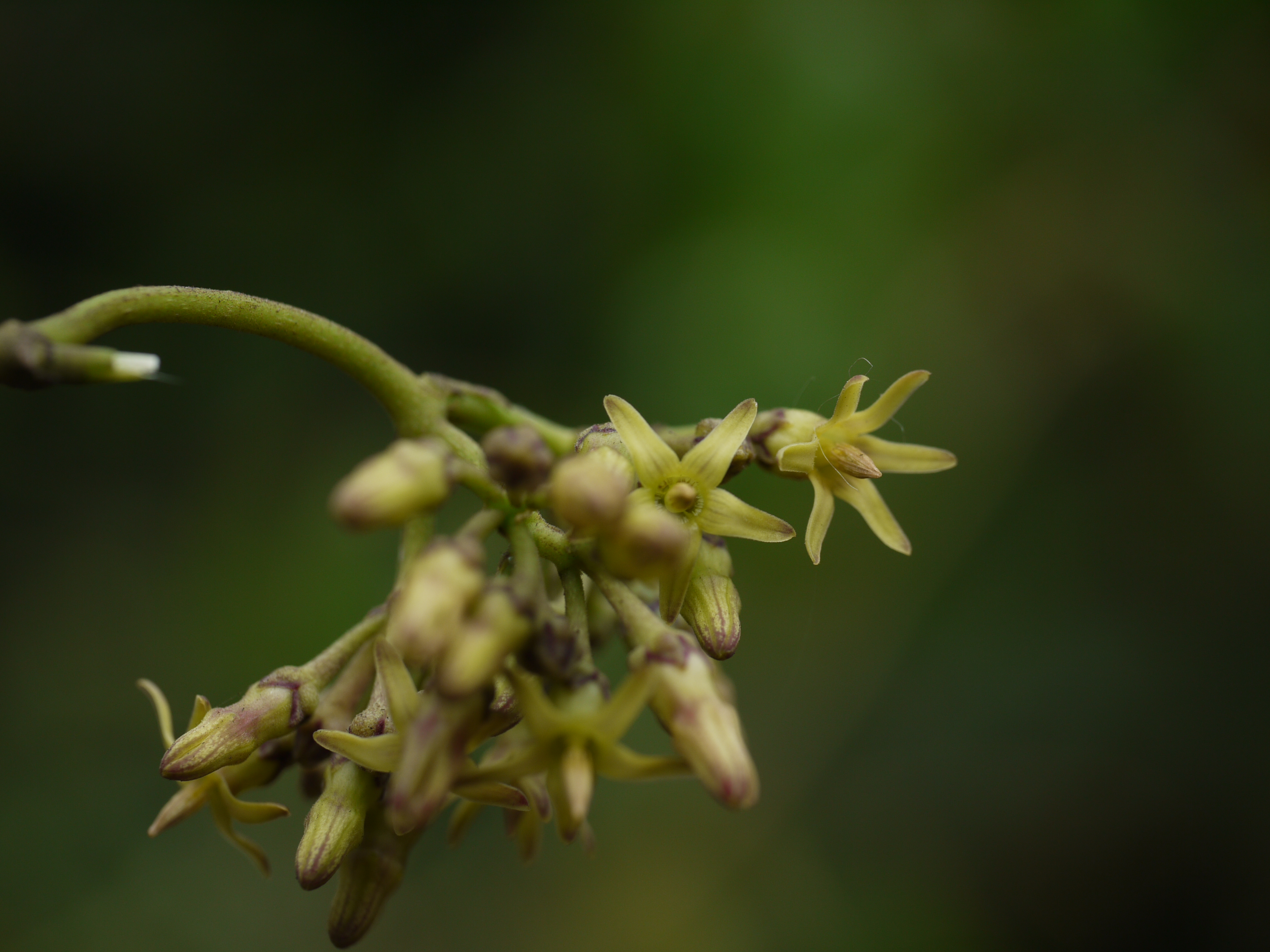

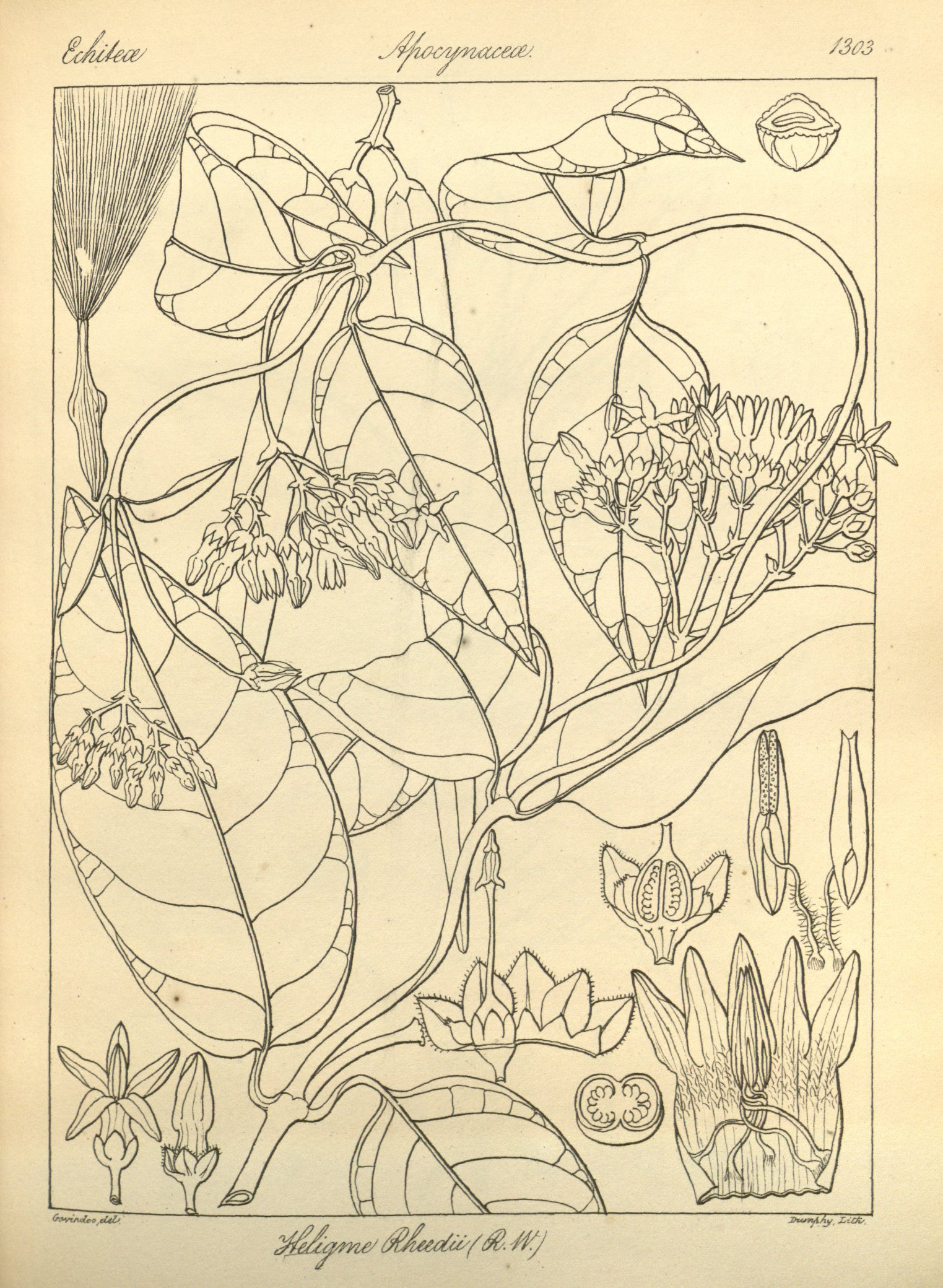
- from Icones Plantarum Indiae Orientalis, vol. 4(2): t. 1303 (1846)

Conservation status
- Near Threatened (TPWCA)

Scientific classification
- Kingdom: Plantae
- Clade: Tracheophytes
- Clade: Angiosperms
- Clade: Eudicots
- Clade: Asterids
- Order: Gentianales
- Family: Apocynaceae
- Genus: Parsonsia
- Species: P. alboflavescens

Binomial name
- Parsonsia alboflavescens (Dennst.) Mabb.
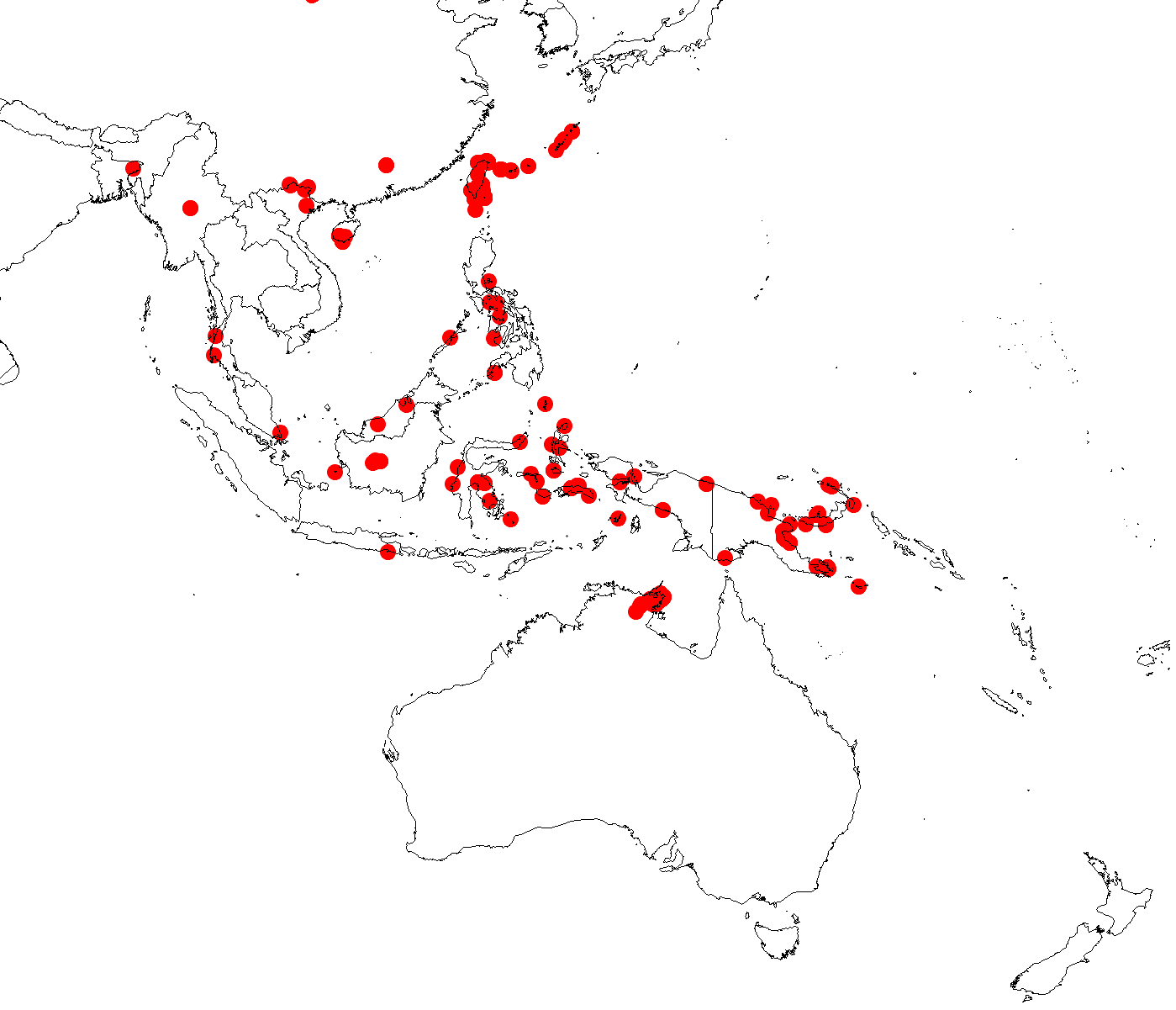
- Occurrence data from GBIF

Synonyms
- List: Aganosma concanensis Hook.; Aganosma laevigata (Moon) J.Graham; Apocynum reticulatum L.; Apocynum vincifolium Burm.f.; Chaetosus volubilis Benth.; Echites laevigatus Moon; Echites spiralis Blanco; Helicandra sinensis Hook. & Arn.; Heligme javanica (Blume) Blume; Heligme korthalsiana Miq.; Heligme minahassae Teijsm. & Binn.; Heligme rheedei Wight; Heligme spiralis (Wall. ex G.Don) Thwaites; Helyga javanica Blume; Helygia javanica (Blume) Blume; Lyonsia sumatrana Ridl.; Lyonsia viridiflora F.M.Bailey; Parsonsia acuminata Wall.; Parsonsia confusa Merr.; Parsonsia cumingiana A.DC.; Parsonsia helicandra Hook. & Arn.; Parsonsia howii Tsiang; Parsonsia javanica (Blume) K.Schum.; Parsonsia korthalsiana (Miq.) Boerl.; Parsonsia kunstleri King & Gamble; Parsonsia laevigata (Moon) Alston; Parsonsia longipedunculata Merr.; Parsonsia magnifolia Elmer; Parsonsia minahassae (Teijsm. & Binn.) Koord.; Parsonsia momiensis Kaneh. & Hatus.; Parsonsia oblancifolia Merr.; Parsonsia oblonga Wall. ex G.Don; Parsonsia oblongifolia Merr.; Parsonsia panniculata Pichon; Parsonsia pauciflora Wall.; Parsonsia rheedei Fern.-Vill.; Parsonsia spiralis Wall. ex G.Don; Parsonsia spiralis Vidal; Periploca alboflavescens Dennst.; Spirostemon spiralis Griff.

= Parsonsia alboflavescens =

Species of plant

Parsonsia alboflavescens is a woody vine of the family Apocynaceae, found from tropical and subtropical Asia to Northern Australia. In the Northern Territory of Australia, where it occurs in Arnhem Land, it has been declared "near threatened".

== Taxonomy ==
Parsonsia alboflavescens was first described in 1818, by Dennstedt, as Periploca alboflavescens. It was described many times. The current name is that given by Mabberley in 1977, who, working through the many names, found that Dennstedt's publication preceded all others, which meant that this Parsonsia took the species epithet, alboflavescens.

=== Type illustrations ===
(See Middleton.)

Rheede tot Drakestein, H.A. van, Hortus Indicus Malabaricus, vol. 9: t. 9 & 10 (1689)

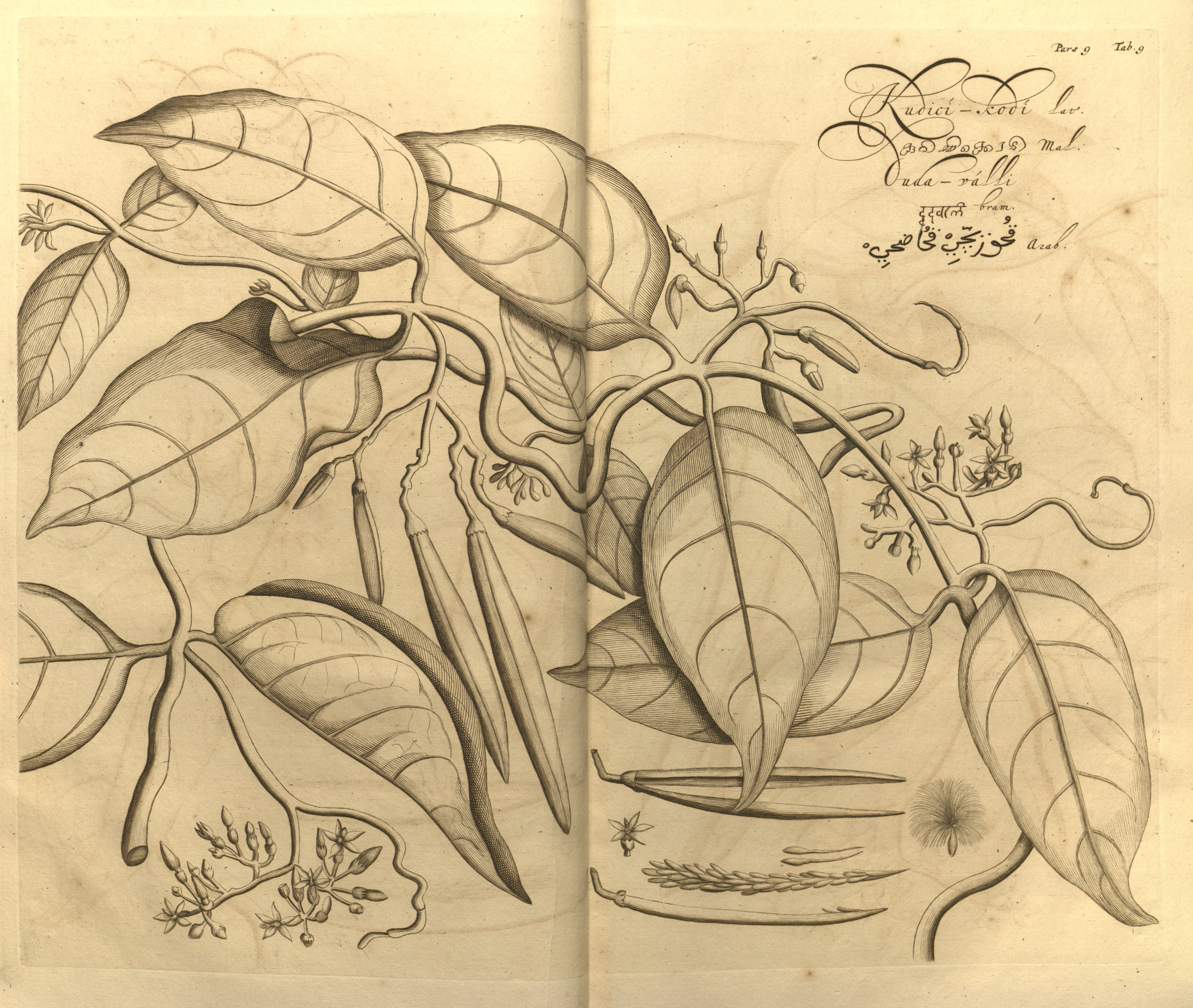

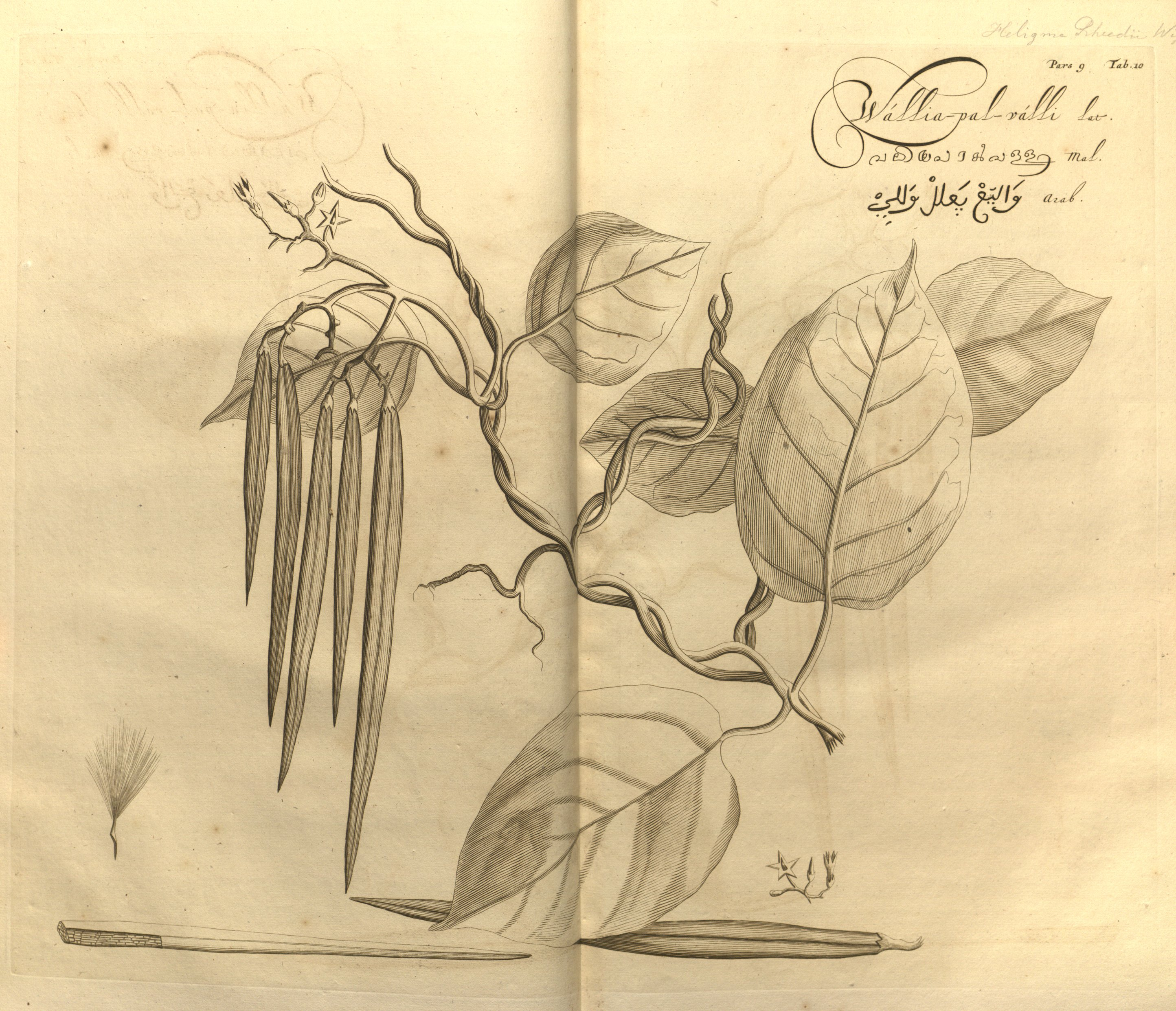

== Etymology ==
Robert Brown gave the generic name, Parsonsia, to honour James Parsons (1705–1770). The species epithet, alboflavescens, is derived from the Latin albus (white). flavescens (turning yellow, becoming yellow) and refers to the flower.
