= Adolph D. E. Elmer =

American botanist and plant collector (1870–1942)

Adolph Daniel Edward Elmer
- Born: June 14, 1870; Van Dyne, Wisconsin, United States
- Died: either April 17, 1942 or July 1942 (aged 71–72); Santo Tomas Internment Camp, Manila, Philippines
- Education: Washington State University; Stanford University
- Relatives: Emma Osterman (wife)
- Scientific career
- Fields: Botany
- Author abbrev. (botany): Elmer

Adolph Daniel Edward Elmer (June 14, 1870 – 1942) was an American botanist and plant collector. He was mostly active in the Philippines, his collections being described as new species by both himself and other botanists. The Japanese sent him into Santo Tomas Internment Camp during the Philippines campaign and he died there.

== Life and achievements ==
Elmer was born on June 14, 1870 in Van Dyne, Wisconsin, United States, to Jacob Van Dyne and Alvina Elmer. He was educated at Washington State College in 1899, married Emma Osterman in 1902 and earned an A.M. from Stanford University in 1903 (or 1904).

Between 1896 and the year of the earning of his A.M., he collected numerous plants in Western United States (especially California) (Note: His name also appears in a list of plant collectors of the Kew Herbarium specimens published in 1901, as one who conducted activity in Washington Territory.) then began describing new plant species, his name appearing in earlier numbers of Botanical Gazette (e.g. Festuca idahoensis in 1903).

In 1904, he went to the Philippines (an unincorporated territory of the United States at that time), where he consequently made his home through the life. He made extensive plant collections in the Philippines from 1904 to 1927, and also in Borneo. According to Albert William Christian Theodore Herre, Elmer Drew Merrill regarded Adolph Daniel Edward Elmer as the best plant collector working in the Philippines and Southwestern Asia until the beginning of WWII. Merrill gave such reputation with a proof, i.e. Merrill (1929). He was editor of Leaflets of Philippine Botany, where he published more than 1,500 new taxa.

== Death ==
Elmer and his wife, Emma Osterman Elmer, had once planned to leave American-controlled Manila and return to their homeland shortly before the Japanese attack on Pearl Harbor occurred.

The Japanese invasion succeeded it in no time and involved the couple, as well.

Adolph Elmer died on either April 17, 1942 or in July 1942, in the Santo Tomas Internment Camp in the Manila, Philippines, of natural causes. His private type collection, held in the Philippine National Herbarium, was destroyed about that time. Emma Osterman Elmer survived internment.

== Legacy ==
Many taxa are named in honor of Elmer, including Zeuxine elmeri (Ames) Ames (syn. Adenostylis elmeri Ames), Begonia elmeri Merr. (syn. B. peltata Elmer, nom. illeg.), Castilleja elmeri Fernald, Cynometra elmeri Merr. (note that at least all of these four examples are based on Elmer's type specimens), and so on.

The genera Adelmeria (Zingiberaceae), Elmera (Saxifragaceae), Elmerinula (Dothideomycetes), and Elmerobryum (Hypnaceae) are also named after him.

== General bibliography ==
- Merrill, E. D. (1929). "Plantae Elmerianae Borneenses". University of California Publications in Botany. 15: 1–316.
- Herre, Albert W.C.T. (1945). "Obituary: A.D.E. Elmer". Science. 101 (2628): 477–478. doi:10.1126/science.101.2628.477. PMID 17735519.
- Copeland, Edwin B. (1949). "A. D. E. Elmer: Leaflets of Philippine Botany". The Philippine Journal of Science. 78 (1): 1–4.
- van Steenis-Kruseman, M. J. (1950). "Elmer, Adolph Daniel Edward". Flora Malesiana. 1. 1: 151–152. - its supplemented version (ElmerADE) is available on the website of the National Herbarium of the Netherlands. Accessed: 21 May 2021.
- Thomas, John H. (1961). "The History of Botanical Collecting in the Santa Cruz Mountains of Central California" (PDF). Contributions from the Dudley Herbarium. 5 (6): 154.
